

298001–298100 

|-bgcolor=#E9E9E9
| 298001 ||  || — || March 4, 2005 || Socorro || LINEAR || — || align=right | 2.9 km || 
|-id=002 bgcolor=#E9E9E9
| 298002 ||  || — || July 16, 2002 || Haleakala || NEAT || — || align=right | 3.1 km || 
|-id=003 bgcolor=#E9E9E9
| 298003 ||  || — || July 18, 2002 || Socorro || LINEAR || EUN || align=right | 1.6 km || 
|-id=004 bgcolor=#E9E9E9
| 298004 ||  || — || July 18, 2002 || Socorro || LINEAR || — || align=right | 2.8 km || 
|-id=005 bgcolor=#E9E9E9
| 298005 ||  || — || July 19, 2002 || Palomar || NEAT || — || align=right | 1.8 km || 
|-id=006 bgcolor=#E9E9E9
| 298006 ||  || — || July 30, 2002 || Haleakala || NEAT || — || align=right | 2.1 km || 
|-id=007 bgcolor=#E9E9E9
| 298007 ||  || — || July 29, 2002 || Palomar || NEAT || — || align=right | 2.9 km || 
|-id=008 bgcolor=#E9E9E9
| 298008 ||  || — || July 20, 2002 || Palomar || NEAT || — || align=right | 3.0 km || 
|-id=009 bgcolor=#E9E9E9
| 298009 ||  || — || November 17, 2007 || Catalina || CSS || — || align=right | 1.6 km || 
|-id=010 bgcolor=#E9E9E9
| 298010 ||  || — || August 3, 2002 || Palomar || NEAT || — || align=right | 2.2 km || 
|-id=011 bgcolor=#E9E9E9
| 298011 ||  || — || August 3, 2002 || Palomar || NEAT || — || align=right | 2.3 km || 
|-id=012 bgcolor=#E9E9E9
| 298012 ||  || — || August 3, 2002 || Palomar || NEAT || — || align=right | 1.5 km || 
|-id=013 bgcolor=#E9E9E9
| 298013 ||  || — || August 5, 2002 || Palomar || NEAT || — || align=right | 2.2 km || 
|-id=014 bgcolor=#E9E9E9
| 298014 ||  || — || August 5, 2002 || Palomar || NEAT || — || align=right | 1.5 km || 
|-id=015 bgcolor=#E9E9E9
| 298015 ||  || — || August 6, 2002 || Palomar || NEAT || — || align=right | 2.2 km || 
|-id=016 bgcolor=#E9E9E9
| 298016 ||  || — || August 6, 2002 || Palomar || NEAT || — || align=right | 1.4 km || 
|-id=017 bgcolor=#E9E9E9
| 298017 ||  || — || August 6, 2002 || Palomar || NEAT || — || align=right | 2.1 km || 
|-id=018 bgcolor=#E9E9E9
| 298018 ||  || — || August 6, 2002 || Palomar || NEAT || — || align=right | 2.8 km || 
|-id=019 bgcolor=#E9E9E9
| 298019 ||  || — || August 6, 2002 || Palomar || NEAT || — || align=right | 2.5 km || 
|-id=020 bgcolor=#E9E9E9
| 298020 ||  || — || August 8, 2002 || Palomar || NEAT || — || align=right | 1.8 km || 
|-id=021 bgcolor=#E9E9E9
| 298021 ||  || — || August 8, 2002 || Palomar || NEAT || — || align=right | 2.2 km || 
|-id=022 bgcolor=#E9E9E9
| 298022 ||  || — || August 11, 2002 || Palomar || NEAT || — || align=right | 2.6 km || 
|-id=023 bgcolor=#E9E9E9
| 298023 ||  || — || August 13, 2002 || Socorro || LINEAR || EUN || align=right | 1.7 km || 
|-id=024 bgcolor=#E9E9E9
| 298024 ||  || — || August 11, 2002 || Socorro || LINEAR || — || align=right | 4.2 km || 
|-id=025 bgcolor=#E9E9E9
| 298025 ||  || — || August 14, 2002 || Palomar || NEAT || — || align=right | 2.5 km || 
|-id=026 bgcolor=#E9E9E9
| 298026 ||  || — || August 12, 2002 || Socorro || LINEAR || — || align=right | 2.5 km || 
|-id=027 bgcolor=#E9E9E9
| 298027 ||  || — || August 12, 2002 || Socorro || LINEAR || — || align=right | 2.7 km || 
|-id=028 bgcolor=#E9E9E9
| 298028 ||  || — || August 13, 2002 || Anderson Mesa || LONEOS || — || align=right | 1.7 km || 
|-id=029 bgcolor=#E9E9E9
| 298029 ||  || — || August 12, 2002 || Socorro || LINEAR || AER || align=right | 1.8 km || 
|-id=030 bgcolor=#E9E9E9
| 298030 ||  || — || August 15, 2002 || Socorro || LINEAR || — || align=right | 3.0 km || 
|-id=031 bgcolor=#E9E9E9
| 298031 ||  || — || August 15, 2002 || Socorro || LINEAR || — || align=right | 4.3 km || 
|-id=032 bgcolor=#E9E9E9
| 298032 ||  || — || August 12, 2002 || Anderson Mesa || LONEOS || — || align=right | 2.9 km || 
|-id=033 bgcolor=#E9E9E9
| 298033 ||  || — || August 10, 2002 || Cerro Tololo || M. W. Buie || — || align=right | 2.4 km || 
|-id=034 bgcolor=#E9E9E9
| 298034 ||  || — || August 8, 2002 || Palomar || S. F. Hönig || — || align=right | 1.7 km || 
|-id=035 bgcolor=#E9E9E9
| 298035 ||  || — || August 8, 2002 || Palomar || S. F. Hönig || — || align=right | 1.5 km || 
|-id=036 bgcolor=#E9E9E9
| 298036 ||  || — || August 8, 2002 || Palomar || S. F. Hönig || — || align=right | 1.7 km || 
|-id=037 bgcolor=#E9E9E9
| 298037 ||  || — || August 8, 2002 || Palomar || S. F. Hönig || MAR || align=right | 1.4 km || 
|-id=038 bgcolor=#E9E9E9
| 298038 ||  || — || August 8, 2002 || Palomar || S. F. Hönig || — || align=right | 1.5 km || 
|-id=039 bgcolor=#E9E9E9
| 298039 ||  || — || August 8, 2002 || Palomar || NEAT || AER || align=right | 1.6 km || 
|-id=040 bgcolor=#E9E9E9
| 298040 ||  || — || August 11, 2002 || Palomar || NEAT || WIT || align=right | 1.4 km || 
|-id=041 bgcolor=#E9E9E9
| 298041 ||  || — || August 14, 2002 || Palomar || NEAT || — || align=right | 1.8 km || 
|-id=042 bgcolor=#E9E9E9
| 298042 ||  || — || August 15, 2002 || Palomar || NEAT || — || align=right | 2.6 km || 
|-id=043 bgcolor=#E9E9E9
| 298043 ||  || — || December 5, 2007 || Catalina || CSS || — || align=right | 1.9 km || 
|-id=044 bgcolor=#E9E9E9
| 298044 ||  || — || October 7, 2007 || Mount Lemmon || Mount Lemmon Survey || — || align=right | 1.5 km || 
|-id=045 bgcolor=#E9E9E9
| 298045 ||  || — || August 16, 2002 || Palomar || NEAT || — || align=right | 1.7 km || 
|-id=046 bgcolor=#E9E9E9
| 298046 ||  || — || August 16, 2002 || Palomar || NEAT || — || align=right | 1.7 km || 
|-id=047 bgcolor=#E9E9E9
| 298047 ||  || — || August 19, 2002 || Palomar || NEAT || — || align=right | 2.3 km || 
|-id=048 bgcolor=#E9E9E9
| 298048 ||  || — || August 26, 2002 || Palomar || NEAT || — || align=right | 2.6 km || 
|-id=049 bgcolor=#E9E9E9
| 298049 ||  || — || August 29, 2002 || Palomar || NEAT || — || align=right | 1.7 km || 
|-id=050 bgcolor=#E9E9E9
| 298050 ||  || — || August 28, 2002 || Palomar || NEAT || MIS || align=right | 3.2 km || 
|-id=051 bgcolor=#E9E9E9
| 298051 ||  || — || August 30, 2002 || Kitt Peak || Spacewatch || — || align=right | 1.8 km || 
|-id=052 bgcolor=#E9E9E9
| 298052 ||  || — || August 30, 2002 || Palomar || NEAT || — || align=right | 2.5 km || 
|-id=053 bgcolor=#E9E9E9
| 298053 ||  || — || August 20, 2002 || Palomar || R. Matson || — || align=right | 1.6 km || 
|-id=054 bgcolor=#E9E9E9
| 298054 ||  || — || August 30, 2002 || Palomar || R. Matson || WIT || align=right | 1.2 km || 
|-id=055 bgcolor=#E9E9E9
| 298055 ||  || — || August 29, 2002 || Palomar || S. F. Hönig || — || align=right | 3.6 km || 
|-id=056 bgcolor=#E9E9E9
| 298056 ||  || — || August 29, 2002 || Palomar || S. F. Hönig || HNS || align=right | 1.5 km || 
|-id=057 bgcolor=#E9E9E9
| 298057 ||  || — || August 17, 2002 || Palomar || NEAT || — || align=right | 1.5 km || 
|-id=058 bgcolor=#E9E9E9
| 298058 ||  || — || August 19, 2002 || Palomar || NEAT || NEM || align=right | 2.6 km || 
|-id=059 bgcolor=#E9E9E9
| 298059 ||  || — || August 17, 2002 || Palomar || NEAT || PAD || align=right | 1.5 km || 
|-id=060 bgcolor=#E9E9E9
| 298060 ||  || — || August 16, 2002 || Palomar || NEAT || WIT || align=right | 1.1 km || 
|-id=061 bgcolor=#E9E9E9
| 298061 ||  || — || August 16, 2002 || Palomar || NEAT || — || align=right | 2.5 km || 
|-id=062 bgcolor=#E9E9E9
| 298062 ||  || — || August 17, 2002 || Palomar || NEAT || — || align=right | 2.7 km || 
|-id=063 bgcolor=#E9E9E9
| 298063 ||  || — || August 17, 2002 || Palomar || NEAT || WIT || align=right data-sort-value="0.96" | 960 m || 
|-id=064 bgcolor=#E9E9E9
| 298064 ||  || — || August 27, 2002 || Palomar || NEAT || — || align=right | 2.6 km || 
|-id=065 bgcolor=#E9E9E9
| 298065 ||  || — || August 18, 2002 || Palomar || NEAT || — || align=right | 2.2 km || 
|-id=066 bgcolor=#E9E9E9
| 298066 ||  || — || August 18, 2002 || Palomar || NEAT || — || align=right | 1.9 km || 
|-id=067 bgcolor=#E9E9E9
| 298067 ||  || — || August 18, 2002 || Palomar || NEAT || — || align=right | 1.8 km || 
|-id=068 bgcolor=#E9E9E9
| 298068 ||  || — || August 27, 2002 || Palomar || NEAT || — || align=right | 1.6 km || 
|-id=069 bgcolor=#E9E9E9
| 298069 ||  || — || August 19, 2002 || Palomar || NEAT || — || align=right | 2.4 km || 
|-id=070 bgcolor=#E9E9E9
| 298070 ||  || — || August 27, 2002 || Palomar || NEAT || — || align=right | 1.4 km || 
|-id=071 bgcolor=#E9E9E9
| 298071 ||  || — || August 18, 2002 || Palomar || NEAT || — || align=right | 1.8 km || 
|-id=072 bgcolor=#E9E9E9
| 298072 ||  || — || August 27, 2002 || Palomar || NEAT || — || align=right | 1.3 km || 
|-id=073 bgcolor=#E9E9E9
| 298073 ||  || — || August 16, 2002 || Palomar || NEAT || — || align=right | 1.6 km || 
|-id=074 bgcolor=#E9E9E9
| 298074 ||  || — || August 27, 2002 || Palomar || NEAT || MIS || align=right | 2.9 km || 
|-id=075 bgcolor=#E9E9E9
| 298075 ||  || — || August 27, 2002 || Palomar || NEAT || ADE || align=right | 3.6 km || 
|-id=076 bgcolor=#E9E9E9
| 298076 ||  || — || August 30, 2002 || Palomar || NEAT || HNS || align=right | 1.7 km || 
|-id=077 bgcolor=#E9E9E9
| 298077 ||  || — || August 30, 2002 || Palomar || NEAT || — || align=right | 1.5 km || 
|-id=078 bgcolor=#E9E9E9
| 298078 ||  || — || August 30, 2002 || Palomar || NEAT || — || align=right | 1.3 km || 
|-id=079 bgcolor=#E9E9E9
| 298079 ||  || — || August 16, 2002 || Palomar || NEAT || — || align=right | 2.1 km || 
|-id=080 bgcolor=#E9E9E9
| 298080 ||  || — || August 30, 2002 || Palomar || NEAT || — || align=right | 1.5 km || 
|-id=081 bgcolor=#E9E9E9
| 298081 ||  || — || August 30, 2002 || Palomar || NEAT || PAD || align=right | 1.4 km || 
|-id=082 bgcolor=#E9E9E9
| 298082 ||  || — || August 19, 2002 || Palomar || NEAT || — || align=right | 2.1 km || 
|-id=083 bgcolor=#E9E9E9
| 298083 ||  || — || August 17, 2002 || Palomar || NEAT || AGN || align=right | 1.6 km || 
|-id=084 bgcolor=#E9E9E9
| 298084 ||  || — || August 17, 2002 || Palomar || NEAT || — || align=right | 1.5 km || 
|-id=085 bgcolor=#E9E9E9
| 298085 ||  || — || October 12, 2007 || Kitt Peak || Spacewatch || — || align=right | 2.4 km || 
|-id=086 bgcolor=#E9E9E9
| 298086 ||  || — || April 2, 2005 || Mount Lemmon || Mount Lemmon Survey || — || align=right | 1.8 km || 
|-id=087 bgcolor=#E9E9E9
| 298087 ||  || — || September 4, 2002 || Anderson Mesa || LONEOS || — || align=right | 2.8 km || 
|-id=088 bgcolor=#E9E9E9
| 298088 ||  || — || September 3, 2002 || Palomar || NEAT || — || align=right | 2.8 km || 
|-id=089 bgcolor=#E9E9E9
| 298089 ||  || — || September 5, 2002 || Anderson Mesa || LONEOS || MAR || align=right | 1.2 km || 
|-id=090 bgcolor=#E9E9E9
| 298090 ||  || — || September 5, 2002 || Socorro || LINEAR || — || align=right | 2.4 km || 
|-id=091 bgcolor=#E9E9E9
| 298091 ||  || — || September 5, 2002 || Socorro || LINEAR || — || align=right | 2.2 km || 
|-id=092 bgcolor=#E9E9E9
| 298092 ||  || — || September 5, 2002 || Socorro || LINEAR || — || align=right | 5.5 km || 
|-id=093 bgcolor=#E9E9E9
| 298093 ||  || — || September 5, 2002 || Socorro || LINEAR || — || align=right | 2.8 km || 
|-id=094 bgcolor=#E9E9E9
| 298094 ||  || — || September 5, 2002 || Anderson Mesa || LONEOS || — || align=right | 2.5 km || 
|-id=095 bgcolor=#E9E9E9
| 298095 ||  || — || September 5, 2002 || Socorro || LINEAR || — || align=right | 2.4 km || 
|-id=096 bgcolor=#E9E9E9
| 298096 ||  || — || September 4, 2002 || Anderson Mesa || LONEOS || HNS || align=right | 1.6 km || 
|-id=097 bgcolor=#E9E9E9
| 298097 ||  || — || September 5, 2002 || Socorro || LINEAR || — || align=right | 3.1 km || 
|-id=098 bgcolor=#E9E9E9
| 298098 ||  || — || September 5, 2002 || Socorro || LINEAR || — || align=right | 2.1 km || 
|-id=099 bgcolor=#E9E9E9
| 298099 ||  || — || September 5, 2002 || Socorro || LINEAR || — || align=right | 3.1 km || 
|-id=100 bgcolor=#E9E9E9
| 298100 ||  || — || September 5, 2002 || Haleakala || NEAT || — || align=right | 2.8 km || 
|}

298101–298200 

|-bgcolor=#E9E9E9
| 298101 ||  || — || September 5, 2002 || Haleakala || NEAT || — || align=right | 2.7 km || 
|-id=102 bgcolor=#E9E9E9
| 298102 ||  || — || September 7, 2002 || Socorro || LINEAR || — || align=right | 2.9 km || 
|-id=103 bgcolor=#E9E9E9
| 298103 ||  || — || September 9, 2002 || Palomar || NEAT || — || align=right | 3.2 km || 
|-id=104 bgcolor=#E9E9E9
| 298104 ||  || — || September 10, 2002 || Palomar || NEAT || — || align=right | 2.2 km || 
|-id=105 bgcolor=#E9E9E9
| 298105 ||  || — || September 10, 2002 || Palomar || NEAT || JUN || align=right | 1.7 km || 
|-id=106 bgcolor=#E9E9E9
| 298106 ||  || — || September 10, 2002 || Palomar || NEAT || — || align=right | 2.3 km || 
|-id=107 bgcolor=#E9E9E9
| 298107 ||  || — || September 10, 2002 || Palomar || NEAT || — || align=right | 3.0 km || 
|-id=108 bgcolor=#E9E9E9
| 298108 ||  || — || September 10, 2002 || Palomar || NEAT || WIT || align=right | 1.6 km || 
|-id=109 bgcolor=#E9E9E9
| 298109 ||  || — || September 11, 2002 || Palomar || NEAT || — || align=right | 2.1 km || 
|-id=110 bgcolor=#E9E9E9
| 298110 ||  || — || September 11, 2002 || Palomar || NEAT || HNA || align=right | 2.0 km || 
|-id=111 bgcolor=#E9E9E9
| 298111 ||  || — || September 12, 2002 || Palomar || NEAT || MAR || align=right | 1.7 km || 
|-id=112 bgcolor=#E9E9E9
| 298112 ||  || — || September 13, 2002 || Kitt Peak || Spacewatch || — || align=right | 1.9 km || 
|-id=113 bgcolor=#E9E9E9
| 298113 ||  || — || September 13, 2002 || Palomar || NEAT || — || align=right | 2.0 km || 
|-id=114 bgcolor=#E9E9E9
| 298114 ||  || — || September 13, 2002 || Palomar || NEAT || — || align=right | 2.2 km || 
|-id=115 bgcolor=#E9E9E9
| 298115 ||  || — || September 13, 2002 || Palomar || NEAT || NEM || align=right | 2.6 km || 
|-id=116 bgcolor=#E9E9E9
| 298116 ||  || — || September 13, 2002 || Palomar || NEAT || MIS || align=right | 2.2 km || 
|-id=117 bgcolor=#E9E9E9
| 298117 ||  || — || September 13, 2002 || Haleakala || NEAT || MAR || align=right | 1.7 km || 
|-id=118 bgcolor=#E9E9E9
| 298118 ||  || — || September 13, 2002 || Palomar || NEAT || — || align=right | 2.0 km || 
|-id=119 bgcolor=#E9E9E9
| 298119 ||  || — || September 14, 2002 || Palomar || NEAT || — || align=right | 2.2 km || 
|-id=120 bgcolor=#E9E9E9
| 298120 ||  || — || September 15, 2002 || Haleakala || NEAT || — || align=right | 2.2 km || 
|-id=121 bgcolor=#E9E9E9
| 298121 ||  || — || September 14, 2002 || Haleakala || NEAT || — || align=right | 2.6 km || 
|-id=122 bgcolor=#E9E9E9
| 298122 ||  || — || September 15, 2002 || Palomar || R. Matson || — || align=right | 2.2 km || 
|-id=123 bgcolor=#E9E9E9
| 298123 ||  || — || September 15, 2002 || Palomar || R. Matson || — || align=right | 1.4 km || 
|-id=124 bgcolor=#E9E9E9
| 298124 ||  || — || September 14, 2002 || Palomar || NEAT || — || align=right | 1.8 km || 
|-id=125 bgcolor=#E9E9E9
| 298125 ||  || — || September 14, 2002 || Palomar || NEAT || — || align=right | 1.5 km || 
|-id=126 bgcolor=#E9E9E9
| 298126 ||  || — || September 15, 2002 || Palomar || NEAT || WIT || align=right | 1.3 km || 
|-id=127 bgcolor=#E9E9E9
| 298127 ||  || — || September 4, 2002 || Palomar || NEAT || — || align=right | 3.1 km || 
|-id=128 bgcolor=#E9E9E9
| 298128 ||  || — || September 12, 2002 || Palomar || NEAT || HEN || align=right | 1.1 km || 
|-id=129 bgcolor=#E9E9E9
| 298129 ||  || — || September 11, 2002 || Palomar || NEAT || — || align=right | 1.8 km || 
|-id=130 bgcolor=#E9E9E9
| 298130 ||  || — || September 15, 2002 || Palomar || NEAT || — || align=right | 2.6 km || 
|-id=131 bgcolor=#E9E9E9
| 298131 ||  || — || September 13, 2002 || Palomar || NEAT || — || align=right | 3.0 km || 
|-id=132 bgcolor=#E9E9E9
| 298132 ||  || — || September 15, 2002 || Anderson Mesa || LONEOS || — || align=right | 2.1 km || 
|-id=133 bgcolor=#E9E9E9
| 298133 ||  || — || September 5, 2002 || Haleakala || NEAT || — || align=right | 2.2 km || 
|-id=134 bgcolor=#E9E9E9
| 298134 ||  || — || September 4, 2002 || Palomar || NEAT || — || align=right | 2.6 km || 
|-id=135 bgcolor=#E9E9E9
| 298135 ||  || — || September 4, 2002 || Palomar || NEAT || — || align=right | 2.0 km || 
|-id=136 bgcolor=#E9E9E9
| 298136 ||  || — || September 14, 2002 || Palomar || NEAT || HEN || align=right | 1.1 km || 
|-id=137 bgcolor=#E9E9E9
| 298137 ||  || — || September 4, 2002 || Palomar || NEAT || — || align=right | 1.9 km || 
|-id=138 bgcolor=#E9E9E9
| 298138 ||  || — || September 14, 2002 || Palomar || NEAT || — || align=right | 1.9 km || 
|-id=139 bgcolor=#E9E9E9
| 298139 ||  || — || September 9, 2002 || Palomar || NEAT || — || align=right | 1.8 km || 
|-id=140 bgcolor=#E9E9E9
| 298140 ||  || — || September 26, 2002 || Palomar || NEAT || — || align=right | 2.9 km || 
|-id=141 bgcolor=#E9E9E9
| 298141 ||  || — || September 27, 2002 || Palomar || NEAT || — || align=right | 2.5 km || 
|-id=142 bgcolor=#E9E9E9
| 298142 ||  || — || September 26, 2002 || Palomar || NEAT || MAR || align=right | 1.8 km || 
|-id=143 bgcolor=#E9E9E9
| 298143 ||  || — || September 28, 2002 || Haleakala || NEAT || XIZ || align=right | 2.1 km || 
|-id=144 bgcolor=#E9E9E9
| 298144 ||  || — || September 30, 2002 || Socorro || LINEAR || — || align=right | 2.0 km || 
|-id=145 bgcolor=#E9E9E9
| 298145 ||  || — || September 29, 2002 || Haleakala || NEAT || ADE || align=right | 2.9 km || 
|-id=146 bgcolor=#E9E9E9
| 298146 ||  || — || September 30, 2002 || Haleakala || NEAT || — || align=right | 2.8 km || 
|-id=147 bgcolor=#E9E9E9
| 298147 ||  || — || September 30, 2002 || Socorro || LINEAR || — || align=right | 3.6 km || 
|-id=148 bgcolor=#E9E9E9
| 298148 ||  || — || September 26, 2002 || Palomar || NEAT || HEN || align=right | 1.3 km || 
|-id=149 bgcolor=#E9E9E9
| 298149 ||  || — || September 16, 2002 || Palomar || NEAT || — || align=right | 2.5 km || 
|-id=150 bgcolor=#E9E9E9
| 298150 ||  || — || September 26, 2002 || Palomar || NEAT || — || align=right | 1.9 km || 
|-id=151 bgcolor=#E9E9E9
| 298151 ||  || — || September 16, 2002 || Palomar || NEAT || — || align=right | 2.0 km || 
|-id=152 bgcolor=#E9E9E9
| 298152 ||  || — || September 26, 2002 || Palomar || NEAT || GEF || align=right | 1.4 km || 
|-id=153 bgcolor=#E9E9E9
| 298153 ||  || — || October 1, 2002 || Anderson Mesa || LONEOS || — || align=right | 3.1 km || 
|-id=154 bgcolor=#E9E9E9
| 298154 ||  || — || October 2, 2002 || Socorro || LINEAR || — || align=right | 2.0 km || 
|-id=155 bgcolor=#E9E9E9
| 298155 ||  || — || October 2, 2002 || Socorro || LINEAR || — || align=right | 3.0 km || 
|-id=156 bgcolor=#E9E9E9
| 298156 ||  || — || October 2, 2002 || Socorro || LINEAR || — || align=right | 2.5 km || 
|-id=157 bgcolor=#E9E9E9
| 298157 ||  || — || October 2, 2002 || Socorro || LINEAR || — || align=right | 2.5 km || 
|-id=158 bgcolor=#E9E9E9
| 298158 ||  || — || October 2, 2002 || Socorro || LINEAR || — || align=right | 4.7 km || 
|-id=159 bgcolor=#E9E9E9
| 298159 ||  || — || October 1, 2002 || Anderson Mesa || LONEOS || — || align=right | 2.7 km || 
|-id=160 bgcolor=#E9E9E9
| 298160 ||  || — || October 2, 2002 || Socorro || LINEAR || — || align=right | 3.1 km || 
|-id=161 bgcolor=#E9E9E9
| 298161 ||  || — || October 3, 2002 || Campo Imperatore || CINEOS || — || align=right | 1.8 km || 
|-id=162 bgcolor=#E9E9E9
| 298162 ||  || — || October 6, 2002 || Uccle || T. Pauwels || DOR || align=right | 2.0 km || 
|-id=163 bgcolor=#E9E9E9
| 298163 ||  || — || October 4, 2002 || Socorro || LINEAR || — || align=right | 3.1 km || 
|-id=164 bgcolor=#E9E9E9
| 298164 ||  || — || October 4, 2002 || Socorro || LINEAR || — || align=right | 2.5 km || 
|-id=165 bgcolor=#E9E9E9
| 298165 ||  || — || October 4, 2002 || Socorro || LINEAR || PAD || align=right | 2.1 km || 
|-id=166 bgcolor=#E9E9E9
| 298166 ||  || — || October 2, 2002 || Haleakala || NEAT || — || align=right | 2.3 km || 
|-id=167 bgcolor=#E9E9E9
| 298167 ||  || — || October 3, 2002 || Palomar || NEAT || — || align=right | 2.9 km || 
|-id=168 bgcolor=#E9E9E9
| 298168 ||  || — || October 4, 2002 || Palomar || NEAT || — || align=right | 3.0 km || 
|-id=169 bgcolor=#E9E9E9
| 298169 ||  || — || October 5, 2002 || Socorro || LINEAR || — || align=right | 4.1 km || 
|-id=170 bgcolor=#E9E9E9
| 298170 ||  || — || October 3, 2002 || Campo Imperatore || CINEOS || EUN || align=right | 1.8 km || 
|-id=171 bgcolor=#E9E9E9
| 298171 ||  || — || October 5, 2002 || Palomar || NEAT || — || align=right | 3.1 km || 
|-id=172 bgcolor=#E9E9E9
| 298172 ||  || — || October 5, 2002 || Palomar || NEAT || — || align=right | 3.3 km || 
|-id=173 bgcolor=#E9E9E9
| 298173 ||  || — || October 5, 2002 || Palomar || NEAT || — || align=right | 3.5 km || 
|-id=174 bgcolor=#E9E9E9
| 298174 ||  || — || October 5, 2002 || Palomar || NEAT || — || align=right | 3.2 km || 
|-id=175 bgcolor=#E9E9E9
| 298175 ||  || — || October 3, 2002 || Palomar || NEAT || JUN || align=right | 1.0 km || 
|-id=176 bgcolor=#E9E9E9
| 298176 ||  || — || October 3, 2002 || Palomar || NEAT || — || align=right | 2.6 km || 
|-id=177 bgcolor=#E9E9E9
| 298177 ||  || — || October 3, 2002 || Palomar || NEAT || — || align=right | 3.1 km || 
|-id=178 bgcolor=#E9E9E9
| 298178 ||  || — || October 3, 2002 || Palomar || NEAT || MAR || align=right | 1.6 km || 
|-id=179 bgcolor=#E9E9E9
| 298179 ||  || — || October 3, 2002 || Palomar || NEAT || — || align=right | 2.5 km || 
|-id=180 bgcolor=#E9E9E9
| 298180 ||  || — || October 3, 2002 || Socorro || LINEAR || GEF || align=right | 1.7 km || 
|-id=181 bgcolor=#E9E9E9
| 298181 ||  || — || October 4, 2002 || Socorro || LINEAR || — || align=right | 3.6 km || 
|-id=182 bgcolor=#E9E9E9
| 298182 ||  || — || October 4, 2002 || Socorro || LINEAR || JUN || align=right | 1.4 km || 
|-id=183 bgcolor=#E9E9E9
| 298183 ||  || — || October 5, 2002 || Socorro || LINEAR || — || align=right | 2.8 km || 
|-id=184 bgcolor=#E9E9E9
| 298184 ||  || — || October 3, 2002 || Socorro || LINEAR || — || align=right | 3.2 km || 
|-id=185 bgcolor=#E9E9E9
| 298185 ||  || — || October 4, 2002 || Palomar || NEAT || MRX || align=right | 1.4 km || 
|-id=186 bgcolor=#E9E9E9
| 298186 ||  || — || October 4, 2002 || Socorro || LINEAR || — || align=right | 2.3 km || 
|-id=187 bgcolor=#E9E9E9
| 298187 ||  || — || October 4, 2002 || Socorro || LINEAR || — || align=right | 2.6 km || 
|-id=188 bgcolor=#E9E9E9
| 298188 ||  || — || October 3, 2002 || Palomar || NEAT || — || align=right | 3.8 km || 
|-id=189 bgcolor=#E9E9E9
| 298189 ||  || — || October 4, 2002 || Socorro || LINEAR || MAR || align=right | 1.8 km || 
|-id=190 bgcolor=#E9E9E9
| 298190 ||  || — || October 4, 2002 || Socorro || LINEAR || — || align=right | 3.5 km || 
|-id=191 bgcolor=#E9E9E9
| 298191 ||  || — || October 6, 2002 || Haleakala || NEAT || — || align=right | 3.2 km || 
|-id=192 bgcolor=#E9E9E9
| 298192 ||  || — || October 6, 2002 || Socorro || LINEAR || INO || align=right | 1.3 km || 
|-id=193 bgcolor=#E9E9E9
| 298193 ||  || — || October 9, 2002 || Socorro || LINEAR || MRX || align=right | 1.4 km || 
|-id=194 bgcolor=#E9E9E9
| 298194 ||  || — || October 10, 2002 || Palomar || NEAT || — || align=right | 2.2 km || 
|-id=195 bgcolor=#E9E9E9
| 298195 ||  || — || October 9, 2002 || Socorro || LINEAR || — || align=right | 4.1 km || 
|-id=196 bgcolor=#E9E9E9
| 298196 ||  || — || October 10, 2002 || Palomar || NEAT || 526 || align=right | 2.9 km || 
|-id=197 bgcolor=#E9E9E9
| 298197 ||  || — || October 9, 2002 || Socorro || LINEAR || — || align=right | 3.2 km || 
|-id=198 bgcolor=#E9E9E9
| 298198 ||  || — || October 10, 2002 || Socorro || LINEAR || GEF || align=right | 2.0 km || 
|-id=199 bgcolor=#E9E9E9
| 298199 ||  || — || October 10, 2002 || Socorro || LINEAR || — || align=right | 3.2 km || 
|-id=200 bgcolor=#E9E9E9
| 298200 ||  || — || October 10, 2002 || Socorro || LINEAR || — || align=right | 3.6 km || 
|}

298201–298300 

|-bgcolor=#E9E9E9
| 298201 ||  || — || October 10, 2002 || Socorro || LINEAR || — || align=right | 4.9 km || 
|-id=202 bgcolor=#E9E9E9
| 298202 ||  || — || October 10, 2002 || Socorro || LINEAR || GEF || align=right | 2.1 km || 
|-id=203 bgcolor=#E9E9E9
| 298203 ||  || — || October 13, 2002 || Palomar || NEAT || — || align=right | 4.8 km || 
|-id=204 bgcolor=#E9E9E9
| 298204 ||  || — || October 12, 2002 || Socorro || LINEAR || — || align=right | 2.5 km || 
|-id=205 bgcolor=#E9E9E9
| 298205 ||  || — || October 12, 2002 || Socorro || LINEAR || — || align=right | 3.1 km || 
|-id=206 bgcolor=#E9E9E9
| 298206 ||  || — || October 15, 2002 || Palomar || NEAT || HOF || align=right | 3.4 km || 
|-id=207 bgcolor=#E9E9E9
| 298207 ||  || — || October 4, 2002 || Apache Point || SDSS || EUN || align=right | 1.9 km || 
|-id=208 bgcolor=#E9E9E9
| 298208 ||  || — || October 5, 2002 || Apache Point || SDSS || WIT || align=right | 1.0 km || 
|-id=209 bgcolor=#E9E9E9
| 298209 ||  || — || October 5, 2002 || Apache Point || SDSS || GEF || align=right | 1.3 km || 
|-id=210 bgcolor=#E9E9E9
| 298210 ||  || — || October 5, 2002 || Apache Point || SDSS || HOF || align=right | 3.1 km || 
|-id=211 bgcolor=#E9E9E9
| 298211 ||  || — || October 10, 2002 || Apache Point || SDSS || MAR || align=right | 1.3 km || 
|-id=212 bgcolor=#E9E9E9
| 298212 ||  || — || October 10, 2002 || Apache Point || SDSS || WIT || align=right data-sort-value="0.98" | 980 m || 
|-id=213 bgcolor=#E9E9E9
| 298213 ||  || — || October 10, 2002 || Apache Point || SDSS || MRX || align=right | 1.0 km || 
|-id=214 bgcolor=#E9E9E9
| 298214 ||  || — || October 10, 2002 || Apache Point || SDSS || WIT || align=right | 1.1 km || 
|-id=215 bgcolor=#E9E9E9
| 298215 ||  || — || October 5, 2002 || Socorro || LINEAR || — || align=right | 3.3 km || 
|-id=216 bgcolor=#E9E9E9
| 298216 ||  || — || October 3, 2002 || Socorro || LINEAR || DOR || align=right | 4.3 km || 
|-id=217 bgcolor=#E9E9E9
| 298217 ||  || — || October 1, 2002 || Anderson Mesa || LONEOS || — || align=right | 3.2 km || 
|-id=218 bgcolor=#E9E9E9
| 298218 ||  || — || October 15, 2002 || Palomar || NEAT || — || align=right | 2.7 km || 
|-id=219 bgcolor=#E9E9E9
| 298219 ||  || — || October 10, 2002 || Apache Point || SDSS || HOF || align=right | 3.5 km || 
|-id=220 bgcolor=#E9E9E9
| 298220 ||  || — || October 28, 2002 || Palomar || NEAT || — || align=right | 3.9 km || 
|-id=221 bgcolor=#E9E9E9
| 298221 ||  || — || October 28, 2002 || Palomar || NEAT || — || align=right | 3.7 km || 
|-id=222 bgcolor=#E9E9E9
| 298222 ||  || — || October 29, 2002 || Kitt Peak || Spacewatch || — || align=right | 3.1 km || 
|-id=223 bgcolor=#E9E9E9
| 298223 ||  || — || October 31, 2002 || Anderson Mesa || LONEOS || DOR || align=right | 2.9 km || 
|-id=224 bgcolor=#E9E9E9
| 298224 ||  || — || October 31, 2002 || Palomar || NEAT || — || align=right | 3.3 km || 
|-id=225 bgcolor=#E9E9E9
| 298225 ||  || — || October 30, 2002 || Kitt Peak || Spacewatch || — || align=right | 2.7 km || 
|-id=226 bgcolor=#E9E9E9
| 298226 ||  || — || October 31, 2002 || Socorro || LINEAR || DOR || align=right | 2.6 km || 
|-id=227 bgcolor=#E9E9E9
| 298227 ||  || — || October 31, 2002 || Needville || Needville Obs. || GEF || align=right | 1.6 km || 
|-id=228 bgcolor=#E9E9E9
| 298228 ||  || — || October 31, 2002 || Socorro || LINEAR || DOR || align=right | 2.9 km || 
|-id=229 bgcolor=#E9E9E9
| 298229 ||  || — || October 30, 2002 || Apache Point || SDSS || PAD || align=right | 1.5 km || 
|-id=230 bgcolor=#E9E9E9
| 298230 ||  || — || October 30, 2002 || Apache Point || SDSS || AER || align=right | 1.6 km || 
|-id=231 bgcolor=#E9E9E9
| 298231 ||  || — || October 31, 2002 || Palomar || NEAT || — || align=right | 2.3 km || 
|-id=232 bgcolor=#E9E9E9
| 298232 ||  || — || October 31, 2002 || Palomar || NEAT || — || align=right | 2.2 km || 
|-id=233 bgcolor=#E9E9E9
| 298233 ||  || — || October 18, 2002 || Palomar || NEAT || WIT || align=right | 1.2 km || 
|-id=234 bgcolor=#E9E9E9
| 298234 ||  || — || October 29, 2002 || Palomar || NEAT || — || align=right | 3.4 km || 
|-id=235 bgcolor=#E9E9E9
| 298235 ||  || — || November 1, 2002 || Haleakala || NEAT || — || align=right | 2.6 km || 
|-id=236 bgcolor=#E9E9E9
| 298236 ||  || — || November 1, 2002 || Palomar || NEAT || CLO || align=right | 3.5 km || 
|-id=237 bgcolor=#E9E9E9
| 298237 ||  || — || November 4, 2002 || Kitt Peak || Spacewatch || — || align=right | 3.5 km || 
|-id=238 bgcolor=#d6d6d6
| 298238 ||  || — || November 4, 2002 || Kitt Peak || Spacewatch || — || align=right | 4.5 km || 
|-id=239 bgcolor=#E9E9E9
| 298239 ||  || — || November 4, 2002 || Anderson Mesa || LONEOS || — || align=right | 3.0 km || 
|-id=240 bgcolor=#E9E9E9
| 298240 ||  || — || November 5, 2002 || Socorro || LINEAR || — || align=right | 2.8 km || 
|-id=241 bgcolor=#E9E9E9
| 298241 ||  || — || November 5, 2002 || Anderson Mesa || LONEOS || — || align=right | 3.7 km || 
|-id=242 bgcolor=#E9E9E9
| 298242 ||  || — || November 5, 2002 || Anderson Mesa || LONEOS || XIZ || align=right | 1.8 km || 
|-id=243 bgcolor=#E9E9E9
| 298243 ||  || — || November 4, 2002 || Palomar || NEAT || — || align=right | 3.0 km || 
|-id=244 bgcolor=#d6d6d6
| 298244 ||  || — || November 4, 2002 || Palomar || NEAT || — || align=right | 4.8 km || 
|-id=245 bgcolor=#E9E9E9
| 298245 ||  || — || November 4, 2002 || Haleakala || NEAT || GEF || align=right | 1.7 km || 
|-id=246 bgcolor=#E9E9E9
| 298246 ||  || — || November 6, 2002 || Socorro || LINEAR || — || align=right | 2.7 km || 
|-id=247 bgcolor=#E9E9E9
| 298247 ||  || — || November 6, 2002 || Anderson Mesa || LONEOS || — || align=right | 3.7 km || 
|-id=248 bgcolor=#E9E9E9
| 298248 ||  || — || November 6, 2002 || Anderson Mesa || LONEOS || — || align=right | 3.5 km || 
|-id=249 bgcolor=#E9E9E9
| 298249 ||  || — || November 6, 2002 || Socorro || LINEAR || — || align=right | 3.1 km || 
|-id=250 bgcolor=#E9E9E9
| 298250 ||  || — || November 6, 2002 || Anderson Mesa || LONEOS || — || align=right | 5.1 km || 
|-id=251 bgcolor=#d6d6d6
| 298251 ||  || — || November 6, 2002 || Haleakala || NEAT || — || align=right | 3.9 km || 
|-id=252 bgcolor=#E9E9E9
| 298252 ||  || — || November 5, 2002 || Socorro || LINEAR || — || align=right | 3.1 km || 
|-id=253 bgcolor=#E9E9E9
| 298253 ||  || — || November 5, 2002 || Socorro || LINEAR || — || align=right | 3.2 km || 
|-id=254 bgcolor=#C2FFFF
| 298254 ||  || — || November 7, 2002 || Socorro || LINEAR || L5 || align=right | 13 km || 
|-id=255 bgcolor=#E9E9E9
| 298255 ||  || — || November 8, 2002 || Socorro || LINEAR || MRX || align=right | 1.6 km || 
|-id=256 bgcolor=#E9E9E9
| 298256 ||  || — || November 11, 2002 || Anderson Mesa || LONEOS || — || align=right | 2.8 km || 
|-id=257 bgcolor=#E9E9E9
| 298257 ||  || — || November 12, 2002 || Anderson Mesa || LONEOS || — || align=right | 3.5 km || 
|-id=258 bgcolor=#E9E9E9
| 298258 ||  || — || November 12, 2002 || Socorro || LINEAR || — || align=right | 3.4 km || 
|-id=259 bgcolor=#E9E9E9
| 298259 ||  || — || November 13, 2002 || Socorro || LINEAR || — || align=right | 3.6 km || 
|-id=260 bgcolor=#E9E9E9
| 298260 ||  || — || November 14, 2002 || Palomar || NEAT || GEF || align=right | 1.9 km || 
|-id=261 bgcolor=#E9E9E9
| 298261 ||  || — || November 15, 2002 || Palomar || NEAT || — || align=right | 2.7 km || 
|-id=262 bgcolor=#E9E9E9
| 298262 ||  || — || November 4, 2002 || Palomar || NEAT || AST || align=right | 2.3 km || 
|-id=263 bgcolor=#E9E9E9
| 298263 ||  || — || November 28, 2002 || Anderson Mesa || LONEOS || DOR || align=right | 3.0 km || 
|-id=264 bgcolor=#E9E9E9
| 298264 ||  || — || November 28, 2002 || Haleakala || NEAT || — || align=right | 3.6 km || 
|-id=265 bgcolor=#E9E9E9
| 298265 ||  || — || November 28, 2002 || Haleakala || NEAT || DOR || align=right | 2.8 km || 
|-id=266 bgcolor=#E9E9E9
| 298266 ||  || — || November 30, 2002 || Socorro || LINEAR || — || align=right | 2.6 km || 
|-id=267 bgcolor=#E9E9E9
| 298267 ||  || — || November 25, 2002 || Kitt Peak || Spacewatch || MRX || align=right | 1.4 km || 
|-id=268 bgcolor=#E9E9E9
| 298268 || 2002 XG || — || December 1, 2002 || Emerald Lane || L. Ball || MRX || align=right | 1.4 km || 
|-id=269 bgcolor=#E9E9E9
| 298269 ||  || — || December 1, 2002 || Haleakala || NEAT || — || align=right | 4.8 km || 
|-id=270 bgcolor=#E9E9E9
| 298270 ||  || — || December 1, 2002 || Socorro || LINEAR || — || align=right | 3.1 km || 
|-id=271 bgcolor=#E9E9E9
| 298271 ||  || — || December 1, 2002 || Socorro || LINEAR || CLO || align=right | 3.4 km || 
|-id=272 bgcolor=#E9E9E9
| 298272 ||  || — || December 2, 2002 || Socorro || LINEAR || — || align=right | 3.7 km || 
|-id=273 bgcolor=#E9E9E9
| 298273 ||  || — || December 3, 2002 || Palomar || NEAT || — || align=right | 4.0 km || 
|-id=274 bgcolor=#E9E9E9
| 298274 ||  || — || December 5, 2002 || Socorro || LINEAR || GEF || align=right | 2.0 km || 
|-id=275 bgcolor=#E9E9E9
| 298275 ||  || — || December 6, 2002 || Socorro || LINEAR || — || align=right | 3.2 km || 
|-id=276 bgcolor=#E9E9E9
| 298276 ||  || — || December 6, 2002 || Palomar || NEAT || DOR || align=right | 3.2 km || 
|-id=277 bgcolor=#E9E9E9
| 298277 ||  || — || December 7, 2002 || Socorro || LINEAR || — || align=right | 2.9 km || 
|-id=278 bgcolor=#E9E9E9
| 298278 ||  || — || December 10, 2002 || Palomar || NEAT || — || align=right | 3.9 km || 
|-id=279 bgcolor=#E9E9E9
| 298279 ||  || — || December 10, 2002 || Desert Eagle || W. K. Y. Yeung || DOR || align=right | 3.5 km || 
|-id=280 bgcolor=#E9E9E9
| 298280 ||  || — || December 13, 2002 || Palomar || NEAT || — || align=right | 2.9 km || 
|-id=281 bgcolor=#E9E9E9
| 298281 ||  || — || December 3, 2002 || Palomar || S. F. Hönig || — || align=right | 3.2 km || 
|-id=282 bgcolor=#E9E9E9
| 298282 ||  || — || December 5, 2002 || Socorro || LINEAR || MRX || align=right | 1.3 km || 
|-id=283 bgcolor=#d6d6d6
| 298283 ||  || — || December 5, 2002 || Socorro || LINEAR || — || align=right | 2.9 km || 
|-id=284 bgcolor=#E9E9E9
| 298284 ||  || — || December 31, 2002 || Socorro || LINEAR || — || align=right | 3.4 km || 
|-id=285 bgcolor=#d6d6d6
| 298285 ||  || — || December 31, 2002 || Socorro || LINEAR || — || align=right | 4.5 km || 
|-id=286 bgcolor=#d6d6d6
| 298286 ||  || — || January 1, 2003 || Kitt Peak || Spacewatch || — || align=right | 4.0 km || 
|-id=287 bgcolor=#d6d6d6
| 298287 ||  || — || January 5, 2003 || Socorro || LINEAR || — || align=right | 4.3 km || 
|-id=288 bgcolor=#d6d6d6
| 298288 ||  || — || January 8, 2003 || Socorro || LINEAR || — || align=right | 3.3 km || 
|-id=289 bgcolor=#d6d6d6
| 298289 ||  || — || January 8, 2003 || Socorro || LINEAR || — || align=right | 4.6 km || 
|-id=290 bgcolor=#d6d6d6
| 298290 ||  || — || January 10, 2003 || Socorro || LINEAR || — || align=right | 3.7 km || 
|-id=291 bgcolor=#E9E9E9
| 298291 ||  || — || January 1, 2003 || Socorro || LINEAR || INO || align=right | 1.8 km || 
|-id=292 bgcolor=#d6d6d6
| 298292 ||  || — || January 5, 2003 || Kitt Peak || Spacewatch || — || align=right | 3.1 km || 
|-id=293 bgcolor=#d6d6d6
| 298293 ||  || — || January 26, 2003 || Palomar || NEAT || — || align=right | 4.8 km || 
|-id=294 bgcolor=#d6d6d6
| 298294 ||  || — || January 26, 2003 || Anderson Mesa || LONEOS || — || align=right | 4.5 km || 
|-id=295 bgcolor=#d6d6d6
| 298295 ||  || — || January 26, 2003 || Palomar || NEAT || — || align=right | 5.7 km || 
|-id=296 bgcolor=#d6d6d6
| 298296 ||  || — || January 26, 2003 || Anderson Mesa || LONEOS || — || align=right | 4.0 km || 
|-id=297 bgcolor=#d6d6d6
| 298297 ||  || — || January 27, 2003 || Socorro || LINEAR || EOS || align=right | 2.7 km || 
|-id=298 bgcolor=#d6d6d6
| 298298 ||  || — || January 27, 2003 || Socorro || LINEAR || — || align=right | 4.2 km || 
|-id=299 bgcolor=#d6d6d6
| 298299 ||  || — || January 28, 2003 || Kitt Peak || Spacewatch || — || align=right | 4.2 km || 
|-id=300 bgcolor=#d6d6d6
| 298300 ||  || — || January 31, 2003 || Anderson Mesa || LONEOS || — || align=right | 3.1 km || 
|}

298301–298400 

|-bgcolor=#d6d6d6
| 298301 ||  || — || February 27, 2009 || Kitt Peak || Spacewatch || — || align=right | 3.9 km || 
|-id=302 bgcolor=#d6d6d6
| 298302 ||  || — || February 1, 2003 || Socorro || LINEAR || — || align=right | 3.2 km || 
|-id=303 bgcolor=#d6d6d6
| 298303 ||  || — || February 7, 2003 || Desert Eagle || W. K. Y. Yeung || — || align=right | 3.3 km || 
|-id=304 bgcolor=#fefefe
| 298304 ||  || — || February 6, 2003 || Kitt Peak || Spacewatch || — || align=right data-sort-value="0.94" | 940 m || 
|-id=305 bgcolor=#fefefe
| 298305 ||  || — || January 31, 2003 || Socorro || LINEAR || FLO || align=right data-sort-value="0.84" | 840 m || 
|-id=306 bgcolor=#fefefe
| 298306 ||  || — || February 21, 2003 || Palomar || NEAT || — || align=right | 1.2 km || 
|-id=307 bgcolor=#fefefe
| 298307 ||  || — || February 22, 2003 || Kitt Peak || Spacewatch || — || align=right | 1.3 km || 
|-id=308 bgcolor=#d6d6d6
| 298308 ||  || — || February 26, 2003 || Campo Imperatore || CINEOS || — || align=right | 3.9 km || 
|-id=309 bgcolor=#d6d6d6
| 298309 ||  || — || February 19, 2003 || Palomar || NEAT || — || align=right | 4.0 km || 
|-id=310 bgcolor=#fefefe
| 298310 ||  || — || March 6, 2003 || Palomar || NEAT || — || align=right | 1.0 km || 
|-id=311 bgcolor=#fefefe
| 298311 ||  || — || March 6, 2003 || Socorro || LINEAR || — || align=right data-sort-value="0.85" | 850 m || 
|-id=312 bgcolor=#d6d6d6
| 298312 ||  || — || March 6, 2003 || Anderson Mesa || LONEOS || HYG || align=right | 5.0 km || 
|-id=313 bgcolor=#d6d6d6
| 298313 ||  || — || March 6, 2003 || Anderson Mesa || LONEOS || — || align=right | 4.2 km || 
|-id=314 bgcolor=#d6d6d6
| 298314 ||  || — || March 7, 2003 || Anderson Mesa || LONEOS || — || align=right | 3.6 km || 
|-id=315 bgcolor=#d6d6d6
| 298315 ||  || — || March 7, 2003 || Socorro || LINEAR || — || align=right | 4.3 km || 
|-id=316 bgcolor=#d6d6d6
| 298316 ||  || — || March 8, 2003 || Anderson Mesa || LONEOS || MEL || align=right | 5.4 km || 
|-id=317 bgcolor=#d6d6d6
| 298317 ||  || — || March 7, 2003 || Anderson Mesa || LONEOS || — || align=right | 7.2 km || 
|-id=318 bgcolor=#fefefe
| 298318 ||  || — || March 7, 2003 || Anderson Mesa || LONEOS || — || align=right data-sort-value="0.91" | 910 m || 
|-id=319 bgcolor=#fefefe
| 298319 ||  || — || March 7, 2003 || Socorro || LINEAR || ERI || align=right | 1.5 km || 
|-id=320 bgcolor=#d6d6d6
| 298320 ||  || — || March 10, 2003 || Campo Imperatore || CINEOS || — || align=right | 5.6 km || 
|-id=321 bgcolor=#d6d6d6
| 298321 ||  || — || March 11, 2003 || Kitt Peak || Spacewatch || 7:4* || align=right | 5.6 km || 
|-id=322 bgcolor=#d6d6d6
| 298322 ||  || — || March 6, 2003 || Anderson Mesa || LONEOS || — || align=right | 3.3 km || 
|-id=323 bgcolor=#d6d6d6
| 298323 ||  || — || March 25, 2003 || Haleakala || NEAT || — || align=right | 5.0 km || 
|-id=324 bgcolor=#fefefe
| 298324 ||  || — || March 23, 2003 || Kitt Peak || Spacewatch || — || align=right | 1.4 km || 
|-id=325 bgcolor=#d6d6d6
| 298325 ||  || — || March 23, 2003 || Kitt Peak || Spacewatch || — || align=right | 3.2 km || 
|-id=326 bgcolor=#d6d6d6
| 298326 ||  || — || March 25, 2003 || Palomar || NEAT || — || align=right | 3.8 km || 
|-id=327 bgcolor=#d6d6d6
| 298327 ||  || — || March 24, 2003 || Kitt Peak || Spacewatch || — || align=right | 4.3 km || 
|-id=328 bgcolor=#fefefe
| 298328 ||  || — || March 24, 2003 || Kitt Peak || Spacewatch || ERI || align=right | 1.5 km || 
|-id=329 bgcolor=#fefefe
| 298329 ||  || — || March 25, 2003 || Palomar || NEAT || — || align=right | 1.4 km || 
|-id=330 bgcolor=#fefefe
| 298330 ||  || — || March 26, 2003 || Palomar || NEAT || ERI || align=right | 1.6 km || 
|-id=331 bgcolor=#fefefe
| 298331 ||  || — || March 28, 2003 || Kitt Peak || Spacewatch || FLO || align=right data-sort-value="0.94" | 940 m || 
|-id=332 bgcolor=#fefefe
| 298332 ||  || — || March 31, 2003 || Anderson Mesa || LONEOS || — || align=right | 1.3 km || 
|-id=333 bgcolor=#d6d6d6
| 298333 ||  || — || March 31, 2003 || Kitt Peak || Spacewatch || — || align=right | 3.6 km || 
|-id=334 bgcolor=#d6d6d6
| 298334 ||  || — || March 31, 2003 || Socorro || LINEAR || — || align=right | 3.5 km || 
|-id=335 bgcolor=#fefefe
| 298335 ||  || — || March 25, 2003 || Anderson Mesa || LONEOS || FLO || align=right data-sort-value="0.75" | 750 m || 
|-id=336 bgcolor=#fefefe
| 298336 ||  || — || March 27, 2003 || Kitt Peak || Spacewatch || NYS || align=right data-sort-value="0.71" | 710 m || 
|-id=337 bgcolor=#d6d6d6
| 298337 ||  || — || March 31, 2003 || Palomar || NEAT || — || align=right | 4.0 km || 
|-id=338 bgcolor=#d6d6d6
| 298338 ||  || — || April 1, 2003 || Palomar || NEAT || — || align=right | 3.2 km || 
|-id=339 bgcolor=#fefefe
| 298339 ||  || — || April 2, 2003 || Socorro || LINEAR || — || align=right | 1.0 km || 
|-id=340 bgcolor=#d6d6d6
| 298340 ||  || — || April 1, 2003 || Socorro || LINEAR || — || align=right | 3.2 km || 
|-id=341 bgcolor=#fefefe
| 298341 ||  || — || April 8, 2003 || Kitt Peak || Spacewatch || — || align=right | 1.0 km || 
|-id=342 bgcolor=#fefefe
| 298342 ||  || — || April 1, 2003 || Kitt Peak || M. W. Buie || — || align=right data-sort-value="0.90" | 900 m || 
|-id=343 bgcolor=#d6d6d6
| 298343 ||  || — || April 24, 2003 || Kitt Peak || Spacewatch || — || align=right | 3.1 km || 
|-id=344 bgcolor=#fefefe
| 298344 ||  || — || April 25, 2003 || Kitt Peak || Spacewatch || NYS || align=right data-sort-value="0.64" | 640 m || 
|-id=345 bgcolor=#d6d6d6
| 298345 ||  || — || April 26, 2003 || Kitt Peak || Spacewatch || — || align=right | 3.4 km || 
|-id=346 bgcolor=#fefefe
| 298346 ||  || — || April 26, 2003 || Kitt Peak || Spacewatch || NYS || align=right data-sort-value="0.68" | 680 m || 
|-id=347 bgcolor=#fefefe
| 298347 ||  || — || April 27, 2003 || Socorro || LINEAR || — || align=right | 2.6 km || 
|-id=348 bgcolor=#d6d6d6
| 298348 ||  || — || April 30, 2003 || Kitt Peak || Spacewatch || — || align=right | 4.0 km || 
|-id=349 bgcolor=#fefefe
| 298349 ||  || — || May 4, 2003 || Kleť || J. Tichá, M. Tichý || — || align=right data-sort-value="0.96" | 960 m || 
|-id=350 bgcolor=#fefefe
| 298350 ||  || — || May 5, 2003 || Kitt Peak || Spacewatch || — || align=right data-sort-value="0.67" | 670 m || 
|-id=351 bgcolor=#fefefe
| 298351 ||  || — || May 26, 2003 || Kitt Peak || Spacewatch || — || align=right data-sort-value="0.94" | 940 m || 
|-id=352 bgcolor=#fefefe
| 298352 ||  || — || May 25, 2003 || Haleakala || NEAT || — || align=right | 1.4 km || 
|-id=353 bgcolor=#d6d6d6
| 298353 ||  || — || May 28, 2003 || Emerald Lane || L. Ball || — || align=right | 4.2 km || 
|-id=354 bgcolor=#fefefe
| 298354 ||  || — || May 27, 2003 || Kitt Peak || Spacewatch || — || align=right data-sort-value="0.99" | 990 m || 
|-id=355 bgcolor=#fefefe
| 298355 ||  || — || June 3, 2003 || Socorro || LINEAR || CHL || align=right | 2.5 km || 
|-id=356 bgcolor=#fefefe
| 298356 ||  || — || July 24, 2003 || Palomar || NEAT || — || align=right | 1.3 km || 
|-id=357 bgcolor=#fefefe
| 298357 ||  || — || July 29, 2003 || Mauna Kea || Y. Torres || EUT || align=right data-sort-value="0.82" | 820 m || 
|-id=358 bgcolor=#fefefe
| 298358 ||  || — || August 4, 2003 || Socorro || LINEAR || — || align=right | 1.3 km || 
|-id=359 bgcolor=#E9E9E9
| 298359 ||  || — || August 23, 2003 || Palomar || NEAT || — || align=right | 1.3 km || 
|-id=360 bgcolor=#fefefe
| 298360 ||  || — || August 23, 2003 || Palomar || NEAT || H || align=right data-sort-value="0.66" | 660 m || 
|-id=361 bgcolor=#fefefe
| 298361 ||  || — || August 23, 2003 || Socorro || LINEAR || — || align=right | 1.2 km || 
|-id=362 bgcolor=#fefefe
| 298362 ||  || — || August 25, 2003 || Socorro || LINEAR || H || align=right data-sort-value="0.94" | 940 m || 
|-id=363 bgcolor=#E9E9E9
| 298363 ||  || — || August 26, 2003 || Socorro || LINEAR || — || align=right | 1.3 km || 
|-id=364 bgcolor=#fefefe
| 298364 ||  || — || August 26, 2003 || Črni Vrh || Črni Vrh || — || align=right data-sort-value="0.98" | 980 m || 
|-id=365 bgcolor=#fefefe
| 298365 ||  || — || August 29, 2003 || Haleakala || NEAT || — || align=right | 1.2 km || 
|-id=366 bgcolor=#E9E9E9
| 298366 ||  || — || August 30, 2003 || Kitt Peak || Spacewatch || RAF || align=right data-sort-value="0.79" | 790 m || 
|-id=367 bgcolor=#fefefe
| 298367 ||  || — || August 31, 2003 || Kitt Peak || Spacewatch || H || align=right data-sort-value="0.78" | 780 m || 
|-id=368 bgcolor=#fefefe
| 298368 ||  || — || August 31, 2003 || Haleakala || NEAT || H || align=right data-sort-value="0.77" | 770 m || 
|-id=369 bgcolor=#fefefe
| 298369 ||  || — || August 27, 2003 || Palomar || NEAT || H || align=right data-sort-value="0.87" | 870 m || 
|-id=370 bgcolor=#E9E9E9
| 298370 ||  || — || September 3, 2003 || Socorro || LINEAR || — || align=right | 1.9 km || 
|-id=371 bgcolor=#fefefe
| 298371 ||  || — || September 4, 2003 || Socorro || LINEAR || H || align=right data-sort-value="0.83" | 830 m || 
|-id=372 bgcolor=#fefefe
| 298372 ||  || — || September 15, 2003 || Palomar || NEAT || NYS || align=right data-sort-value="0.97" | 970 m || 
|-id=373 bgcolor=#E9E9E9
| 298373 ||  || — || September 16, 2003 || Palomar || NEAT || BRU || align=right | 2.7 km || 
|-id=374 bgcolor=#E9E9E9
| 298374 ||  || — || September 16, 2003 || Kitt Peak || Spacewatch || — || align=right | 1.2 km || 
|-id=375 bgcolor=#E9E9E9
| 298375 ||  || — || September 18, 2003 || Kitt Peak || Spacewatch || — || align=right data-sort-value="0.98" | 980 m || 
|-id=376 bgcolor=#d6d6d6
| 298376 ||  || — || September 16, 2003 || Anderson Mesa || LONEOS || HIL3:2 || align=right | 6.1 km || 
|-id=377 bgcolor=#fefefe
| 298377 ||  || — || September 18, 2003 || Palomar || NEAT || — || align=right | 3.2 km || 
|-id=378 bgcolor=#E9E9E9
| 298378 ||  || — || September 18, 2003 || Palomar || NEAT || — || align=right | 2.0 km || 
|-id=379 bgcolor=#fefefe
| 298379 ||  || — || September 18, 2003 || Palomar || NEAT || — || align=right | 1.3 km || 
|-id=380 bgcolor=#fefefe
| 298380 ||  || — || September 17, 2003 || Anderson Mesa || LONEOS || — || align=right | 1.0 km || 
|-id=381 bgcolor=#fefefe
| 298381 ||  || — || September 18, 2003 || Kitt Peak || Spacewatch || H || align=right | 1.1 km || 
|-id=382 bgcolor=#E9E9E9
| 298382 ||  || — || September 18, 2003 || Kitt Peak || Spacewatch || — || align=right data-sort-value="0.99" | 990 m || 
|-id=383 bgcolor=#E9E9E9
| 298383 ||  || — || September 20, 2003 || Palomar || NEAT || EUN || align=right | 1.4 km || 
|-id=384 bgcolor=#fefefe
| 298384 ||  || — || September 16, 2003 || Anderson Mesa || LONEOS || — || align=right | 1.2 km || 
|-id=385 bgcolor=#fefefe
| 298385 ||  || — || September 20, 2003 || Socorro || LINEAR || H || align=right data-sort-value="0.77" | 770 m || 
|-id=386 bgcolor=#fefefe
| 298386 ||  || — || September 18, 2003 || Haleakala || NEAT || H || align=right data-sort-value="0.74" | 740 m || 
|-id=387 bgcolor=#E9E9E9
| 298387 ||  || — || September 16, 2003 || Kitt Peak || Spacewatch || — || align=right | 1.0 km || 
|-id=388 bgcolor=#E9E9E9
| 298388 ||  || — || August 31, 2003 || Haleakala || NEAT || — || align=right | 1.2 km || 
|-id=389 bgcolor=#E9E9E9
| 298389 ||  || — || September 21, 2003 || Kitt Peak || Spacewatch || — || align=right | 1.3 km || 
|-id=390 bgcolor=#fefefe
| 298390 ||  || — || September 18, 2003 || Kitt Peak || Spacewatch || — || align=right | 1.2 km || 
|-id=391 bgcolor=#E9E9E9
| 298391 ||  || — || September 19, 2003 || Kitt Peak || Spacewatch || — || align=right data-sort-value="0.99" | 990 m || 
|-id=392 bgcolor=#E9E9E9
| 298392 ||  || — || September 22, 2003 || Anderson Mesa || LONEOS || — || align=right | 2.1 km || 
|-id=393 bgcolor=#d6d6d6
| 298393 ||  || — || September 20, 2003 || Socorro || LINEAR || 3:2 || align=right | 5.7 km || 
|-id=394 bgcolor=#FA8072
| 298394 ||  || — || September 26, 2003 || Socorro || LINEAR || H || align=right data-sort-value="0.89" | 890 m || 
|-id=395 bgcolor=#E9E9E9
| 298395 ||  || — || September 26, 2003 || Socorro || LINEAR || — || align=right | 1.1 km || 
|-id=396 bgcolor=#E9E9E9
| 298396 ||  || — || September 26, 2003 || Socorro || LINEAR || — || align=right | 1.7 km || 
|-id=397 bgcolor=#E9E9E9
| 298397 ||  || — || September 27, 2003 || Kitt Peak || Spacewatch || — || align=right | 1.2 km || 
|-id=398 bgcolor=#E9E9E9
| 298398 ||  || — || September 27, 2003 || Kitt Peak || Spacewatch || RAF || align=right data-sort-value="0.76" | 760 m || 
|-id=399 bgcolor=#E9E9E9
| 298399 ||  || — || September 28, 2003 || Kitt Peak || Spacewatch || — || align=right data-sort-value="0.86" | 860 m || 
|-id=400 bgcolor=#E9E9E9
| 298400 ||  || — || September 27, 2003 || Socorro || LINEAR || — || align=right data-sort-value="0.65" | 650 m || 
|}

298401–298500 

|-bgcolor=#E9E9E9
| 298401 ||  || — || September 27, 2003 || Socorro || LINEAR || ADE || align=right | 3.2 km || 
|-id=402 bgcolor=#E9E9E9
| 298402 ||  || — || September 28, 2003 || Socorro || LINEAR || — || align=right | 1.5 km || 
|-id=403 bgcolor=#E9E9E9
| 298403 ||  || — || September 29, 2003 || Kitt Peak || Spacewatch || — || align=right data-sort-value="0.83" | 830 m || 
|-id=404 bgcolor=#E9E9E9
| 298404 ||  || — || September 25, 2003 || Uccle || T. Pauwels || — || align=right data-sort-value="0.97" | 970 m || 
|-id=405 bgcolor=#E9E9E9
| 298405 ||  || — || September 24, 2003 || Haleakala || NEAT || RAF || align=right | 1.0 km || 
|-id=406 bgcolor=#E9E9E9
| 298406 ||  || — || September 25, 2003 || Palomar || NEAT || — || align=right | 1.3 km || 
|-id=407 bgcolor=#E9E9E9
| 298407 ||  || — || September 26, 2003 || Palomar || NEAT || EUN || align=right | 1.6 km || 
|-id=408 bgcolor=#E9E9E9
| 298408 ||  || — || September 18, 2003 || Palomar || NEAT || — || align=right | 1.2 km || 
|-id=409 bgcolor=#E9E9E9
| 298409 ||  || — || September 28, 2003 || Socorro || LINEAR || — || align=right | 2.3 km || 
|-id=410 bgcolor=#E9E9E9
| 298410 ||  || — || September 29, 2003 || Anderson Mesa || LONEOS || — || align=right | 3.2 km || 
|-id=411 bgcolor=#E9E9E9
| 298411 ||  || — || September 29, 2003 || Anderson Mesa || LONEOS || — || align=right | 1.7 km || 
|-id=412 bgcolor=#E9E9E9
| 298412 ||  || — || September 17, 2003 || Palomar || NEAT || — || align=right | 1.8 km || 
|-id=413 bgcolor=#E9E9E9
| 298413 ||  || — || September 26, 2003 || Socorro || LINEAR || — || align=right | 1.9 km || 
|-id=414 bgcolor=#E9E9E9
| 298414 ||  || — || September 27, 2003 || Socorro || LINEAR || — || align=right | 1.2 km || 
|-id=415 bgcolor=#E9E9E9
| 298415 ||  || — || September 27, 2003 || Apache Point || SDSS || — || align=right | 1.6 km || 
|-id=416 bgcolor=#E9E9E9
| 298416 ||  || — || September 30, 2003 || Kitt Peak || Spacewatch || — || align=right | 1.5 km || 
|-id=417 bgcolor=#d6d6d6
| 298417 ||  || — || September 17, 2003 || Kitt Peak || Spacewatch || 3:2 || align=right | 3.9 km || 
|-id=418 bgcolor=#E9E9E9
| 298418 ||  || — || September 27, 2003 || Socorro || LINEAR || — || align=right | 1.6 km || 
|-id=419 bgcolor=#E9E9E9
| 298419 ||  || — || September 18, 2003 || Kitt Peak || Spacewatch || — || align=right | 1.1 km || 
|-id=420 bgcolor=#d6d6d6
| 298420 ||  || — || September 22, 2003 || Kitt Peak || Spacewatch || 3:2 || align=right | 6.5 km || 
|-id=421 bgcolor=#E9E9E9
| 298421 ||  || — || September 26, 2003 || Apache Point || SDSS || — || align=right data-sort-value="0.97" | 970 m || 
|-id=422 bgcolor=#E9E9E9
| 298422 ||  || — || September 27, 2003 || Apache Point || SDSS || — || align=right | 1.5 km || 
|-id=423 bgcolor=#E9E9E9
| 298423 ||  || — || September 27, 2003 || Apache Point || SDSS || MIT || align=right | 2.7 km || 
|-id=424 bgcolor=#E9E9E9
| 298424 ||  || — || September 19, 2003 || Kitt Peak || Spacewatch || — || align=right | 1.1 km || 
|-id=425 bgcolor=#fefefe
| 298425 || 2003 TU || — || October 3, 2003 || Kingsnake || J. V. McClusky || H || align=right | 1.3 km || 
|-id=426 bgcolor=#E9E9E9
| 298426 ||  || — || October 14, 2003 || Anderson Mesa || LONEOS || — || align=right data-sort-value="0.85" | 850 m || 
|-id=427 bgcolor=#E9E9E9
| 298427 ||  || — || October 15, 2003 || Anderson Mesa || LONEOS || — || align=right | 1.3 km || 
|-id=428 bgcolor=#fefefe
| 298428 ||  || — || October 5, 2003 || Socorro || LINEAR || H || align=right data-sort-value="0.87" | 870 m || 
|-id=429 bgcolor=#E9E9E9
| 298429 ||  || — || October 5, 2003 || Kitt Peak || Spacewatch || — || align=right | 1.3 km || 
|-id=430 bgcolor=#E9E9E9
| 298430 ||  || — || October 5, 2003 || Socorro || LINEAR || — || align=right | 1.8 km || 
|-id=431 bgcolor=#E9E9E9
| 298431 ||  || — || October 5, 2003 || Socorro || LINEAR || — || align=right | 1.2 km || 
|-id=432 bgcolor=#E9E9E9
| 298432 ||  || — || October 16, 2003 || Kitt Peak || Spacewatch || — || align=right | 1.9 km || 
|-id=433 bgcolor=#E9E9E9
| 298433 ||  || — || October 19, 2003 || Palomar || NEAT || — || align=right | 1.8 km || 
|-id=434 bgcolor=#E9E9E9
| 298434 ||  || — || October 19, 2003 || Palomar || NEAT || — || align=right | 1.0 km || 
|-id=435 bgcolor=#fefefe
| 298435 ||  || — || October 19, 2003 || Palomar || NEAT || H || align=right data-sort-value="0.78" | 780 m || 
|-id=436 bgcolor=#E9E9E9
| 298436 ||  || — || October 16, 2003 || Anderson Mesa || LONEOS || — || align=right | 1.8 km || 
|-id=437 bgcolor=#E9E9E9
| 298437 ||  || — || October 20, 2003 || Kingsnake || J. V. McClusky || EUN || align=right | 1.4 km || 
|-id=438 bgcolor=#fefefe
| 298438 ||  || — || October 21, 2003 || Socorro || LINEAR || H || align=right | 1.1 km || 
|-id=439 bgcolor=#E9E9E9
| 298439 ||  || — || October 23, 2003 || Junk Bond || Junk Bond Obs. || — || align=right | 1.2 km || 
|-id=440 bgcolor=#E9E9E9
| 298440 ||  || — || October 19, 2003 || Kitt Peak || Spacewatch || — || align=right | 1.7 km || 
|-id=441 bgcolor=#E9E9E9
| 298441 ||  || — || October 16, 2003 || Kitt Peak || Spacewatch || EUN || align=right data-sort-value="0.88" | 880 m || 
|-id=442 bgcolor=#E9E9E9
| 298442 ||  || — || October 17, 2003 || Kitt Peak || Spacewatch || — || align=right data-sort-value="0.97" | 970 m || 
|-id=443 bgcolor=#E9E9E9
| 298443 ||  || — || October 16, 2003 || Palomar || NEAT || — || align=right | 1.8 km || 
|-id=444 bgcolor=#E9E9E9
| 298444 ||  || — || October 18, 2003 || Kitt Peak || Spacewatch || — || align=right | 2.4 km || 
|-id=445 bgcolor=#E9E9E9
| 298445 ||  || — || October 18, 2003 || Palomar || NEAT || — || align=right | 1.6 km || 
|-id=446 bgcolor=#E9E9E9
| 298446 ||  || — || October 18, 2003 || Palomar || NEAT || — || align=right | 1.6 km || 
|-id=447 bgcolor=#E9E9E9
| 298447 ||  || — || October 19, 2003 || Goodricke-Pigott || R. A. Tucker || — || align=right | 1.0 km || 
|-id=448 bgcolor=#E9E9E9
| 298448 ||  || — || October 16, 2003 || Kitt Peak || Spacewatch || — || align=right | 2.0 km || 
|-id=449 bgcolor=#E9E9E9
| 298449 ||  || — || October 16, 2003 || Anderson Mesa || LONEOS || — || align=right | 1.7 km || 
|-id=450 bgcolor=#E9E9E9
| 298450 ||  || — || October 16, 2003 || Kitt Peak || Spacewatch || — || align=right | 1.2 km || 
|-id=451 bgcolor=#E9E9E9
| 298451 ||  || — || October 19, 2003 || Kitt Peak || Spacewatch || — || align=right | 1.2 km || 
|-id=452 bgcolor=#E9E9E9
| 298452 ||  || — || October 17, 2003 || Anderson Mesa || LONEOS || — || align=right | 1.1 km || 
|-id=453 bgcolor=#E9E9E9
| 298453 ||  || — || October 17, 2003 || Kitt Peak || Spacewatch || — || align=right | 1.4 km || 
|-id=454 bgcolor=#E9E9E9
| 298454 ||  || — || October 18, 2003 || Kitt Peak || Spacewatch || — || align=right | 1.0 km || 
|-id=455 bgcolor=#E9E9E9
| 298455 ||  || — || October 19, 2003 || Kitt Peak || Spacewatch || GER || align=right | 1.4 km || 
|-id=456 bgcolor=#d6d6d6
| 298456 ||  || — || October 18, 2003 || Kitt Peak || Spacewatch || 3:2 || align=right | 5.1 km || 
|-id=457 bgcolor=#E9E9E9
| 298457 ||  || — || October 19, 2003 || Palomar || NEAT || — || align=right | 1.4 km || 
|-id=458 bgcolor=#E9E9E9
| 298458 ||  || — || October 18, 2003 || Kitt Peak || Spacewatch || — || align=right | 1.1 km || 
|-id=459 bgcolor=#E9E9E9
| 298459 ||  || — || October 21, 2003 || Kitt Peak || Spacewatch || — || align=right | 1.5 km || 
|-id=460 bgcolor=#E9E9E9
| 298460 ||  || — || October 21, 2003 || Kitt Peak || Spacewatch || — || align=right | 1.6 km || 
|-id=461 bgcolor=#E9E9E9
| 298461 ||  || — || October 21, 2003 || Kitt Peak || Spacewatch || — || align=right data-sort-value="0.67" | 670 m || 
|-id=462 bgcolor=#E9E9E9
| 298462 ||  || — || October 18, 2003 || Anderson Mesa || LONEOS || GER || align=right | 1.9 km || 
|-id=463 bgcolor=#E9E9E9
| 298463 ||  || — || October 18, 2003 || Anderson Mesa || LONEOS || — || align=right | 1.0 km || 
|-id=464 bgcolor=#E9E9E9
| 298464 ||  || — || October 20, 2003 || Kitt Peak || Spacewatch || — || align=right | 1.1 km || 
|-id=465 bgcolor=#E9E9E9
| 298465 ||  || — || October 21, 2003 || Kitt Peak || Spacewatch || — || align=right | 2.0 km || 
|-id=466 bgcolor=#E9E9E9
| 298466 ||  || — || October 20, 2003 || Kitt Peak || Spacewatch || EUN || align=right | 1.5 km || 
|-id=467 bgcolor=#E9E9E9
| 298467 ||  || — || October 22, 2003 || Kitt Peak || Spacewatch || — || align=right data-sort-value="0.96" | 960 m || 
|-id=468 bgcolor=#E9E9E9
| 298468 ||  || — || October 22, 2003 || Kitt Peak || Spacewatch || — || align=right | 1.9 km || 
|-id=469 bgcolor=#E9E9E9
| 298469 ||  || — || October 21, 2003 || Kitt Peak || Spacewatch || — || align=right | 1.3 km || 
|-id=470 bgcolor=#E9E9E9
| 298470 ||  || — || October 21, 2003 || Socorro || LINEAR || — || align=right | 1.0 km || 
|-id=471 bgcolor=#E9E9E9
| 298471 ||  || — || October 21, 2003 || Socorro || LINEAR || — || align=right | 1.7 km || 
|-id=472 bgcolor=#E9E9E9
| 298472 ||  || — || October 21, 2003 || Socorro || LINEAR || — || align=right | 1.3 km || 
|-id=473 bgcolor=#E9E9E9
| 298473 ||  || — || October 22, 2003 || Socorro || LINEAR || — || align=right | 1.2 km || 
|-id=474 bgcolor=#E9E9E9
| 298474 ||  || — || October 22, 2003 || Socorro || LINEAR || — || align=right | 4.8 km || 
|-id=475 bgcolor=#E9E9E9
| 298475 ||  || — || October 23, 2003 || Kitt Peak || Spacewatch || — || align=right | 1.6 km || 
|-id=476 bgcolor=#E9E9E9
| 298476 ||  || — || October 23, 2003 || Kitt Peak || Spacewatch || — || align=right | 1.7 km || 
|-id=477 bgcolor=#E9E9E9
| 298477 ||  || — || October 21, 2003 || Kitt Peak || Spacewatch || — || align=right | 1.1 km || 
|-id=478 bgcolor=#E9E9E9
| 298478 ||  || — || October 21, 2003 || Socorro || LINEAR || — || align=right | 1.4 km || 
|-id=479 bgcolor=#E9E9E9
| 298479 ||  || — || October 22, 2003 || Kitt Peak || Spacewatch || — || align=right | 1.4 km || 
|-id=480 bgcolor=#E9E9E9
| 298480 ||  || — || October 23, 2003 || Kitt Peak || Spacewatch || — || align=right | 1.4 km || 
|-id=481 bgcolor=#E9E9E9
| 298481 ||  || — || October 24, 2003 || Socorro || LINEAR || — || align=right data-sort-value="0.97" | 970 m || 
|-id=482 bgcolor=#E9E9E9
| 298482 ||  || — || October 24, 2003 || Socorro || LINEAR || — || align=right | 1.6 km || 
|-id=483 bgcolor=#E9E9E9
| 298483 ||  || — || October 25, 2003 || Socorro || LINEAR || — || align=right | 1.1 km || 
|-id=484 bgcolor=#d6d6d6
| 298484 ||  || — || October 26, 2003 || Kitt Peak || Spacewatch || HIL3:2 || align=right | 5.9 km || 
|-id=485 bgcolor=#E9E9E9
| 298485 ||  || — || October 26, 2003 || Kitt Peak || Spacewatch || ADE || align=right | 1.7 km || 
|-id=486 bgcolor=#E9E9E9
| 298486 ||  || — || October 27, 2003 || Socorro || LINEAR || — || align=right | 1.6 km || 
|-id=487 bgcolor=#E9E9E9
| 298487 ||  || — || October 27, 2003 || Socorro || LINEAR || RAF || align=right | 1.6 km || 
|-id=488 bgcolor=#E9E9E9
| 298488 ||  || — || October 27, 2003 || Haleakala || NEAT || — || align=right | 1.7 km || 
|-id=489 bgcolor=#E9E9E9
| 298489 ||  || — || October 28, 2003 || Socorro || LINEAR || RAF || align=right | 1.1 km || 
|-id=490 bgcolor=#E9E9E9
| 298490 ||  || — || October 28, 2003 || Socorro || LINEAR || — || align=right | 1.2 km || 
|-id=491 bgcolor=#E9E9E9
| 298491 ||  || — || October 29, 2003 || Catalina || CSS || BRG || align=right | 2.4 km || 
|-id=492 bgcolor=#E9E9E9
| 298492 ||  || — || October 30, 2003 || Socorro || LINEAR || — || align=right | 1.4 km || 
|-id=493 bgcolor=#E9E9E9
| 298493 ||  || — || October 27, 2003 || Socorro || LINEAR || — || align=right | 1.3 km || 
|-id=494 bgcolor=#E9E9E9
| 298494 ||  || — || October 29, 2003 || Anderson Mesa || LONEOS || ADE || align=right | 2.7 km || 
|-id=495 bgcolor=#E9E9E9
| 298495 ||  || — || October 22, 2003 || Kitt Peak || M. W. Buie || — || align=right | 1.6 km || 
|-id=496 bgcolor=#E9E9E9
| 298496 ||  || — || October 19, 2003 || Apache Point || SDSS || — || align=right data-sort-value="0.62" | 620 m || 
|-id=497 bgcolor=#E9E9E9
| 298497 ||  || — || November 3, 1999 || Kitt Peak || Spacewatch || — || align=right | 1.2 km || 
|-id=498 bgcolor=#d6d6d6
| 298498 ||  || — || October 19, 2003 || Apache Point || SDSS || 3:2 || align=right | 5.2 km || 
|-id=499 bgcolor=#E9E9E9
| 298499 ||  || — || October 21, 2003 || Kitt Peak || Spacewatch || — || align=right data-sort-value="0.86" | 860 m || 
|-id=500 bgcolor=#fefefe
| 298500 ||  || — || October 22, 2003 || Apache Point || SDSS || — || align=right | 1.3 km || 
|}

298501–298600 

|-bgcolor=#E9E9E9
| 298501 ||  || — || October 17, 2003 || Kitt Peak || Spacewatch || — || align=right data-sort-value="0.97" | 970 m || 
|-id=502 bgcolor=#fefefe
| 298502 ||  || — || November 3, 2003 || Socorro || LINEAR || H || align=right data-sort-value="0.83" | 830 m || 
|-id=503 bgcolor=#E9E9E9
| 298503 ||  || — || November 6, 2003 || Socorro || LINEAR || — || align=right | 2.1 km || 
|-id=504 bgcolor=#E9E9E9
| 298504 ||  || — || November 15, 2003 || Kitt Peak || Spacewatch || — || align=right | 1.5 km || 
|-id=505 bgcolor=#E9E9E9
| 298505 ||  || — || November 15, 2003 || Palomar || NEAT || — || align=right | 1.2 km || 
|-id=506 bgcolor=#E9E9E9
| 298506 ||  || — || November 15, 2003 || Palomar || NEAT || EUN || align=right | 2.0 km || 
|-id=507 bgcolor=#E9E9E9
| 298507 ||  || — || November 15, 2003 || Palomar || NEAT || — || align=right | 1.1 km || 
|-id=508 bgcolor=#E9E9E9
| 298508 ||  || — || November 16, 2003 || Catalina || CSS || — || align=right | 1.9 km || 
|-id=509 bgcolor=#E9E9E9
| 298509 ||  || — || November 18, 2003 || Kitt Peak || Spacewatch || — || align=right | 1.2 km || 
|-id=510 bgcolor=#E9E9E9
| 298510 ||  || — || November 18, 2003 || Kitt Peak || Spacewatch || — || align=right | 1.8 km || 
|-id=511 bgcolor=#E9E9E9
| 298511 ||  || — || November 16, 2003 || Kitt Peak || Spacewatch || — || align=right data-sort-value="0.94" | 940 m || 
|-id=512 bgcolor=#E9E9E9
| 298512 ||  || — || November 18, 2003 || Palomar || NEAT || — || align=right | 3.1 km || 
|-id=513 bgcolor=#E9E9E9
| 298513 ||  || — || November 19, 2003 || Socorro || LINEAR || — || align=right | 1.3 km || 
|-id=514 bgcolor=#E9E9E9
| 298514 ||  || — || November 19, 2003 || Socorro || LINEAR || — || align=right | 2.8 km || 
|-id=515 bgcolor=#E9E9E9
| 298515 ||  || — || November 16, 2003 || Kitt Peak || Spacewatch || — || align=right | 1.4 km || 
|-id=516 bgcolor=#E9E9E9
| 298516 ||  || — || November 16, 2003 || Kitt Peak || Spacewatch || — || align=right | 1.3 km || 
|-id=517 bgcolor=#E9E9E9
| 298517 ||  || — || November 18, 2003 || Kitt Peak || Spacewatch || — || align=right | 1.3 km || 
|-id=518 bgcolor=#E9E9E9
| 298518 ||  || — || November 18, 2003 || Palomar || NEAT || — || align=right | 1.6 km || 
|-id=519 bgcolor=#E9E9E9
| 298519 ||  || — || November 18, 2003 || Palomar || NEAT || — || align=right | 2.6 km || 
|-id=520 bgcolor=#E9E9E9
| 298520 ||  || — || November 19, 2003 || Socorro || LINEAR || EUN || align=right | 1.5 km || 
|-id=521 bgcolor=#E9E9E9
| 298521 ||  || — || November 19, 2003 || Socorro || LINEAR || HNS || align=right | 2.0 km || 
|-id=522 bgcolor=#E9E9E9
| 298522 ||  || — || November 19, 2003 || Kitt Peak || Spacewatch || — || align=right | 1.2 km || 
|-id=523 bgcolor=#E9E9E9
| 298523 ||  || — || November 19, 2003 || Kitt Peak || Spacewatch || — || align=right | 1.3 km || 
|-id=524 bgcolor=#E9E9E9
| 298524 ||  || — || November 19, 2003 || Kitt Peak || Spacewatch || — || align=right | 1.4 km || 
|-id=525 bgcolor=#E9E9E9
| 298525 ||  || — || November 19, 2003 || Kitt Peak || Spacewatch || BRG || align=right | 1.6 km || 
|-id=526 bgcolor=#E9E9E9
| 298526 ||  || — || November 19, 2003 || Kitt Peak || Spacewatch || — || align=right | 3.6 km || 
|-id=527 bgcolor=#E9E9E9
| 298527 ||  || — || November 20, 2003 || Socorro || LINEAR || — || align=right data-sort-value="0.86" | 860 m || 
|-id=528 bgcolor=#E9E9E9
| 298528 ||  || — || November 20, 2003 || Socorro || LINEAR || — || align=right | 1.6 km || 
|-id=529 bgcolor=#E9E9E9
| 298529 ||  || — || November 20, 2003 || Kitt Peak || Spacewatch || — || align=right | 1.3 km || 
|-id=530 bgcolor=#E9E9E9
| 298530 ||  || — || November 18, 2003 || Kitt Peak || Spacewatch || — || align=right data-sort-value="0.96" | 960 m || 
|-id=531 bgcolor=#E9E9E9
| 298531 ||  || — || November 19, 2003 || Anderson Mesa || LONEOS || — || align=right | 1.3 km || 
|-id=532 bgcolor=#E9E9E9
| 298532 ||  || — || November 20, 2003 || Socorro || LINEAR || — || align=right | 1.1 km || 
|-id=533 bgcolor=#E9E9E9
| 298533 ||  || — || November 21, 2003 || Socorro || LINEAR || — || align=right | 1.1 km || 
|-id=534 bgcolor=#E9E9E9
| 298534 ||  || — || November 20, 2003 || Socorro || LINEAR || — || align=right | 1.0 km || 
|-id=535 bgcolor=#E9E9E9
| 298535 ||  || — || November 20, 2003 || Socorro || LINEAR || GEF || align=right | 1.8 km || 
|-id=536 bgcolor=#E9E9E9
| 298536 ||  || — || November 20, 2003 || Socorro || LINEAR || BRU || align=right | 4.2 km || 
|-id=537 bgcolor=#E9E9E9
| 298537 ||  || — || November 20, 2003 || Socorro || LINEAR || RAF || align=right | 1.9 km || 
|-id=538 bgcolor=#E9E9E9
| 298538 ||  || — || November 20, 2003 || Socorro || LINEAR || — || align=right | 2.2 km || 
|-id=539 bgcolor=#E9E9E9
| 298539 ||  || — || November 20, 2003 || Socorro || LINEAR || — || align=right | 1.1 km || 
|-id=540 bgcolor=#E9E9E9
| 298540 ||  || — || November 20, 2003 || Socorro || LINEAR || — || align=right | 1.5 km || 
|-id=541 bgcolor=#E9E9E9
| 298541 ||  || — || November 20, 2003 || Socorro || LINEAR || — || align=right | 2.2 km || 
|-id=542 bgcolor=#E9E9E9
| 298542 ||  || — || November 21, 2003 || Kitt Peak || Spacewatch || — || align=right | 1.0 km || 
|-id=543 bgcolor=#E9E9E9
| 298543 ||  || — || November 21, 2003 || Socorro || LINEAR || — || align=right | 2.0 km || 
|-id=544 bgcolor=#E9E9E9
| 298544 ||  || — || November 21, 2003 || Socorro || LINEAR || — || align=right | 2.2 km || 
|-id=545 bgcolor=#E9E9E9
| 298545 ||  || — || November 21, 2003 || Socorro || LINEAR || — || align=right | 1.7 km || 
|-id=546 bgcolor=#E9E9E9
| 298546 ||  || — || November 21, 2003 || Socorro || LINEAR || — || align=right | 2.5 km || 
|-id=547 bgcolor=#E9E9E9
| 298547 ||  || — || November 21, 2003 || Socorro || LINEAR || EUN || align=right | 1.8 km || 
|-id=548 bgcolor=#E9E9E9
| 298548 ||  || — || November 23, 2003 || Kitt Peak || Spacewatch || — || align=right | 1.9 km || 
|-id=549 bgcolor=#E9E9E9
| 298549 ||  || — || November 23, 2003 || Kitt Peak || Spacewatch || — || align=right | 1.1 km || 
|-id=550 bgcolor=#E9E9E9
| 298550 ||  || — || November 24, 2003 || Socorro || LINEAR || — || align=right | 2.0 km || 
|-id=551 bgcolor=#E9E9E9
| 298551 ||  || — || November 24, 2003 || Anderson Mesa || LONEOS || HNS || align=right | 1.6 km || 
|-id=552 bgcolor=#E9E9E9
| 298552 ||  || — || November 26, 2003 || Kitt Peak || Spacewatch || — || align=right | 1.3 km || 
|-id=553 bgcolor=#E9E9E9
| 298553 ||  || — || November 29, 2003 || Socorro || LINEAR || — || align=right | 1.6 km || 
|-id=554 bgcolor=#E9E9E9
| 298554 ||  || — || November 30, 2003 || Kitt Peak || Spacewatch || — || align=right | 1.1 km || 
|-id=555 bgcolor=#E9E9E9
| 298555 ||  || — || November 29, 2003 || Socorro || LINEAR || — || align=right | 1.5 km || 
|-id=556 bgcolor=#E9E9E9
| 298556 ||  || — || November 23, 2003 || Socorro || LINEAR || GAL || align=right | 2.9 km || 
|-id=557 bgcolor=#E9E9E9
| 298557 ||  || — || December 1, 2003 || Socorro || LINEAR || — || align=right | 1.2 km || 
|-id=558 bgcolor=#E9E9E9
| 298558 ||  || — || December 1, 2003 || Socorro || LINEAR || — || align=right | 1.2 km || 
|-id=559 bgcolor=#E9E9E9
| 298559 ||  || — || December 3, 2003 || Socorro || LINEAR || — || align=right | 1.5 km || 
|-id=560 bgcolor=#E9E9E9
| 298560 ||  || — || December 4, 2003 || Socorro || LINEAR || — || align=right | 2.1 km || 
|-id=561 bgcolor=#E9E9E9
| 298561 ||  || — || December 4, 2003 || Socorro || LINEAR || — || align=right | 2.0 km || 
|-id=562 bgcolor=#E9E9E9
| 298562 ||  || — || December 4, 2003 || Socorro || LINEAR || — || align=right | 1.9 km || 
|-id=563 bgcolor=#E9E9E9
| 298563 ||  || — || December 4, 2003 || Socorro || LINEAR || — || align=right | 1.5 km || 
|-id=564 bgcolor=#E9E9E9
| 298564 ||  || — || December 15, 2003 || Socorro || LINEAR || — || align=right | 1.5 km || 
|-id=565 bgcolor=#E9E9E9
| 298565 ||  || — || December 14, 2003 || Kitt Peak || Spacewatch || — || align=right | 1.6 km || 
|-id=566 bgcolor=#E9E9E9
| 298566 ||  || — || December 1, 2003 || Kitt Peak || Spacewatch || — || align=right | 2.1 km || 
|-id=567 bgcolor=#E9E9E9
| 298567 ||  || — || December 4, 2003 || Socorro || LINEAR || — || align=right | 1.8 km || 
|-id=568 bgcolor=#E9E9E9
| 298568 ||  || — || December 5, 2003 || Catalina || CSS || — || align=right | 1.8 km || 
|-id=569 bgcolor=#E9E9E9
| 298569 ||  || — || December 14, 2003 || Kitt Peak || Spacewatch || — || align=right | 1.3 km || 
|-id=570 bgcolor=#E9E9E9
| 298570 ||  || — || December 4, 2003 || Socorro || LINEAR || — || align=right | 1.4 km || 
|-id=571 bgcolor=#E9E9E9
| 298571 ||  || — || December 17, 2003 || Socorro || LINEAR || — || align=right | 2.7 km || 
|-id=572 bgcolor=#E9E9E9
| 298572 ||  || — || December 19, 2003 || Socorro || LINEAR || — || align=right | 2.0 km || 
|-id=573 bgcolor=#fefefe
| 298573 ||  || — || December 17, 2003 || Socorro || LINEAR || H || align=right data-sort-value="0.80" | 800 m || 
|-id=574 bgcolor=#E9E9E9
| 298574 ||  || — || December 17, 2003 || Kitt Peak || Spacewatch || — || align=right | 1.7 km || 
|-id=575 bgcolor=#E9E9E9
| 298575 ||  || — || December 17, 2003 || Socorro || LINEAR || — || align=right | 1.2 km || 
|-id=576 bgcolor=#E9E9E9
| 298576 ||  || — || December 17, 2003 || Socorro || LINEAR || — || align=right | 2.4 km || 
|-id=577 bgcolor=#E9E9E9
| 298577 ||  || — || December 17, 2003 || Socorro || LINEAR || JUN || align=right | 1.2 km || 
|-id=578 bgcolor=#E9E9E9
| 298578 ||  || — || December 17, 2003 || Kitt Peak || Spacewatch || — || align=right | 2.2 km || 
|-id=579 bgcolor=#E9E9E9
| 298579 ||  || — || December 17, 2003 || Kitt Peak || Spacewatch || — || align=right | 3.3 km || 
|-id=580 bgcolor=#E9E9E9
| 298580 ||  || — || December 18, 2003 || Socorro || LINEAR || — || align=right | 2.3 km || 
|-id=581 bgcolor=#E9E9E9
| 298581 ||  || — || December 16, 2003 || Catalina || CSS || — || align=right | 3.8 km || 
|-id=582 bgcolor=#E9E9E9
| 298582 ||  || — || December 17, 2003 || Kitt Peak || Spacewatch || ADE || align=right | 2.6 km || 
|-id=583 bgcolor=#E9E9E9
| 298583 ||  || — || December 16, 2003 || Kitt Peak || Spacewatch || — || align=right | 1.3 km || 
|-id=584 bgcolor=#E9E9E9
| 298584 ||  || — || December 17, 2003 || Anderson Mesa || LONEOS || — || align=right | 2.1 km || 
|-id=585 bgcolor=#E9E9E9
| 298585 ||  || — || December 18, 2003 || Haleakala || NEAT || — || align=right | 1.4 km || 
|-id=586 bgcolor=#E9E9E9
| 298586 ||  || — || December 19, 2003 || Kitt Peak || Spacewatch || — || align=right | 1.8 km || 
|-id=587 bgcolor=#E9E9E9
| 298587 ||  || — || December 17, 2003 || Kitt Peak || Spacewatch || — || align=right | 1.9 km || 
|-id=588 bgcolor=#E9E9E9
| 298588 ||  || — || December 19, 2003 || Socorro || LINEAR || MAR || align=right | 1.6 km || 
|-id=589 bgcolor=#E9E9E9
| 298589 ||  || — || December 19, 2003 || Socorro || LINEAR || — || align=right | 2.9 km || 
|-id=590 bgcolor=#E9E9E9
| 298590 ||  || — || December 19, 2003 || Socorro || LINEAR || MIS || align=right | 3.3 km || 
|-id=591 bgcolor=#E9E9E9
| 298591 ||  || — || December 19, 2003 || Socorro || LINEAR || — || align=right | 2.5 km || 
|-id=592 bgcolor=#E9E9E9
| 298592 ||  || — || December 19, 2003 || Socorro || LINEAR || — || align=right | 2.2 km || 
|-id=593 bgcolor=#E9E9E9
| 298593 ||  || — || December 18, 2003 || Socorro || LINEAR || — || align=right | 3.7 km || 
|-id=594 bgcolor=#E9E9E9
| 298594 ||  || — || December 19, 2003 || Socorro || LINEAR || — || align=right | 1.6 km || 
|-id=595 bgcolor=#E9E9E9
| 298595 ||  || — || December 21, 2003 || Catalina || CSS || — || align=right | 2.6 km || 
|-id=596 bgcolor=#E9E9E9
| 298596 ||  || — || December 25, 2003 || Haleakala || NEAT || — || align=right | 2.2 km || 
|-id=597 bgcolor=#E9E9E9
| 298597 ||  || — || December 27, 2003 || Socorro || LINEAR || — || align=right | 1.7 km || 
|-id=598 bgcolor=#E9E9E9
| 298598 ||  || — || December 28, 2003 || Kitt Peak || Spacewatch || EUN || align=right | 1.6 km || 
|-id=599 bgcolor=#E9E9E9
| 298599 ||  || — || December 28, 2003 || Kitt Peak || Spacewatch || — || align=right | 2.3 km || 
|-id=600 bgcolor=#E9E9E9
| 298600 ||  || — || December 27, 2003 || Socorro || LINEAR || — || align=right | 2.1 km || 
|}

298601–298700 

|-bgcolor=#E9E9E9
| 298601 ||  || — || December 28, 2003 || Socorro || LINEAR || — || align=right | 2.5 km || 
|-id=602 bgcolor=#E9E9E9
| 298602 ||  || — || December 28, 2003 || Socorro || LINEAR || GER || align=right | 2.1 km || 
|-id=603 bgcolor=#E9E9E9
| 298603 ||  || — || December 28, 2003 || Socorro || LINEAR || — || align=right | 1.8 km || 
|-id=604 bgcolor=#E9E9E9
| 298604 ||  || — || December 28, 2003 || Socorro || LINEAR || — || align=right | 2.2 km || 
|-id=605 bgcolor=#E9E9E9
| 298605 ||  || — || December 28, 2003 || Socorro || LINEAR || — || align=right | 2.7 km || 
|-id=606 bgcolor=#E9E9E9
| 298606 ||  || — || December 27, 2003 || Socorro || LINEAR || — || align=right | 1.9 km || 
|-id=607 bgcolor=#E9E9E9
| 298607 ||  || — || December 27, 2003 || Socorro || LINEAR || EUN || align=right | 1.8 km || 
|-id=608 bgcolor=#E9E9E9
| 298608 ||  || — || December 28, 2003 || Socorro || LINEAR || — || align=right | 3.3 km || 
|-id=609 bgcolor=#E9E9E9
| 298609 ||  || — || December 28, 2003 || Socorro || LINEAR || — || align=right | 1.8 km || 
|-id=610 bgcolor=#E9E9E9
| 298610 ||  || — || December 29, 2003 || Socorro || LINEAR || — || align=right | 1.9 km || 
|-id=611 bgcolor=#E9E9E9
| 298611 ||  || — || December 29, 2003 || Catalina || CSS || — || align=right | 3.0 km || 
|-id=612 bgcolor=#E9E9E9
| 298612 ||  || — || December 29, 2003 || Catalina || CSS || — || align=right | 2.3 km || 
|-id=613 bgcolor=#E9E9E9
| 298613 ||  || — || December 18, 2003 || Socorro || LINEAR || — || align=right | 1.1 km || 
|-id=614 bgcolor=#C2FFFF
| 298614 ||  || — || December 19, 2003 || Kitt Peak || Spacewatch || L5 || align=right | 13 km || 
|-id=615 bgcolor=#FA8072
| 298615 ||  || — || January 13, 2004 || Palomar || NEAT || — || align=right | 1.1 km || 
|-id=616 bgcolor=#E9E9E9
| 298616 ||  || — || January 14, 2004 || Palomar || NEAT || EUN || align=right | 2.0 km || 
|-id=617 bgcolor=#E9E9E9
| 298617 ||  || — || January 13, 2004 || Kitt Peak || Spacewatch || — || align=right | 3.4 km || 
|-id=618 bgcolor=#E9E9E9
| 298618 ||  || — || January 13, 2004 || Kitt Peak || Spacewatch || — || align=right | 1.5 km || 
|-id=619 bgcolor=#E9E9E9
| 298619 ||  || — || December 21, 2003 || Kitt Peak || Spacewatch || HOF || align=right | 2.8 km || 
|-id=620 bgcolor=#E9E9E9
| 298620 ||  || — || April 13, 1996 || Kitt Peak || Spacewatch || — || align=right | 2.4 km || 
|-id=621 bgcolor=#E9E9E9
| 298621 ||  || — || January 13, 2004 || Palomar || NEAT || — || align=right | 1.4 km || 
|-id=622 bgcolor=#E9E9E9
| 298622 ||  || — || January 16, 2004 || Kitt Peak || Spacewatch || WIT || align=right | 1.2 km || 
|-id=623 bgcolor=#E9E9E9
| 298623 ||  || — || January 16, 2004 || Palomar || NEAT || — || align=right | 1.7 km || 
|-id=624 bgcolor=#E9E9E9
| 298624 ||  || — || January 16, 2004 || Palomar || NEAT || — || align=right | 3.8 km || 
|-id=625 bgcolor=#E9E9E9
| 298625 ||  || — || January 17, 2004 || Palomar || NEAT || MRX || align=right | 1.4 km || 
|-id=626 bgcolor=#E9E9E9
| 298626 ||  || — || January 17, 2004 || Palomar || NEAT || — || align=right | 2.8 km || 
|-id=627 bgcolor=#E9E9E9
| 298627 ||  || — || January 16, 2004 || Kitt Peak || Spacewatch || — || align=right | 2.6 km || 
|-id=628 bgcolor=#E9E9E9
| 298628 ||  || — || January 16, 2004 || Palomar || NEAT || — || align=right | 2.4 km || 
|-id=629 bgcolor=#E9E9E9
| 298629 ||  || — || January 18, 2004 || Kitt Peak || Spacewatch || — || align=right | 1.9 km || 
|-id=630 bgcolor=#E9E9E9
| 298630 ||  || — || January 19, 2004 || Socorro || LINEAR || JUN || align=right data-sort-value="0.90" | 900 m || 
|-id=631 bgcolor=#E9E9E9
| 298631 ||  || — || January 18, 2004 || Kitt Peak || Spacewatch || — || align=right | 2.5 km || 
|-id=632 bgcolor=#E9E9E9
| 298632 ||  || — || January 19, 2004 || Kitt Peak || Spacewatch || — || align=right | 2.2 km || 
|-id=633 bgcolor=#E9E9E9
| 298633 ||  || — || January 19, 2004 || Kitt Peak || Spacewatch || — || align=right | 2.2 km || 
|-id=634 bgcolor=#E9E9E9
| 298634 ||  || — || January 19, 2004 || Catalina || CSS || — || align=right | 2.2 km || 
|-id=635 bgcolor=#E9E9E9
| 298635 ||  || — || January 23, 2004 || Wrightwood || J. W. Young || — || align=right | 3.1 km || 
|-id=636 bgcolor=#E9E9E9
| 298636 ||  || — || January 19, 2004 || Catalina || CSS || CLO || align=right | 2.6 km || 
|-id=637 bgcolor=#E9E9E9
| 298637 ||  || — || January 22, 2004 || Socorro || LINEAR || — || align=right | 2.6 km || 
|-id=638 bgcolor=#E9E9E9
| 298638 ||  || — || January 22, 2004 || Socorro || LINEAR || — || align=right | 2.3 km || 
|-id=639 bgcolor=#E9E9E9
| 298639 ||  || — || January 22, 2004 || Socorro || LINEAR || MRX || align=right | 1.3 km || 
|-id=640 bgcolor=#E9E9E9
| 298640 ||  || — || January 22, 2004 || Socorro || LINEAR || AGN || align=right | 1.4 km || 
|-id=641 bgcolor=#E9E9E9
| 298641 ||  || — || January 22, 2004 || Socorro || LINEAR || — || align=right | 2.1 km || 
|-id=642 bgcolor=#d6d6d6
| 298642 ||  || — || January 23, 2004 || Anderson Mesa || LONEOS || EUP || align=right | 7.4 km || 
|-id=643 bgcolor=#E9E9E9
| 298643 ||  || — || January 23, 2004 || Socorro || LINEAR || — || align=right | 3.7 km || 
|-id=644 bgcolor=#E9E9E9
| 298644 ||  || — || January 24, 2004 || Socorro || LINEAR || — || align=right | 1.6 km || 
|-id=645 bgcolor=#E9E9E9
| 298645 ||  || — || January 24, 2004 || Socorro || LINEAR || AEO || align=right | 1.9 km || 
|-id=646 bgcolor=#E9E9E9
| 298646 ||  || — || January 23, 2004 || Socorro || LINEAR || — || align=right | 3.0 km || 
|-id=647 bgcolor=#d6d6d6
| 298647 ||  || — || January 29, 2004 || Kitt Peak || Spacewatch || — || align=right | 4.8 km || 
|-id=648 bgcolor=#E9E9E9
| 298648 ||  || — || January 26, 2004 || Anderson Mesa || LONEOS || NEM || align=right | 3.4 km || 
|-id=649 bgcolor=#E9E9E9
| 298649 ||  || — || January 28, 2004 || Kitt Peak || Spacewatch || MIS || align=right | 3.2 km || 
|-id=650 bgcolor=#E9E9E9
| 298650 ||  || — || January 29, 2004 || Socorro || LINEAR || — || align=right | 3.2 km || 
|-id=651 bgcolor=#E9E9E9
| 298651 ||  || — || January 28, 2004 || Catalina || CSS || EUN || align=right | 1.5 km || 
|-id=652 bgcolor=#E9E9E9
| 298652 ||  || — || January 30, 2004 || Catalina || CSS || — || align=right | 2.3 km || 
|-id=653 bgcolor=#E9E9E9
| 298653 ||  || — || January 16, 2004 || Palomar || NEAT || — || align=right | 2.6 km || 
|-id=654 bgcolor=#E9E9E9
| 298654 ||  || — || January 28, 2004 || Kitt Peak || Spacewatch || — || align=right | 2.0 km || 
|-id=655 bgcolor=#E9E9E9
| 298655 ||  || — || February 12, 2004 || Goodricke-Pigott || R. A. Tucker || GEF || align=right | 1.8 km || 
|-id=656 bgcolor=#E9E9E9
| 298656 ||  || — || February 11, 2004 || Palomar || NEAT || WIT || align=right | 1.5 km || 
|-id=657 bgcolor=#d6d6d6
| 298657 ||  || — || February 11, 2004 || Palomar || NEAT || — || align=right | 3.3 km || 
|-id=658 bgcolor=#E9E9E9
| 298658 ||  || — || February 11, 2004 || Kitt Peak || Spacewatch || MRX || align=right | 1.3 km || 
|-id=659 bgcolor=#E9E9E9
| 298659 ||  || — || February 12, 2004 || Kitt Peak || Spacewatch || — || align=right | 1.9 km || 
|-id=660 bgcolor=#E9E9E9
| 298660 ||  || — || February 12, 2004 || Kitt Peak || Spacewatch || — || align=right | 2.1 km || 
|-id=661 bgcolor=#E9E9E9
| 298661 ||  || — || February 12, 2004 || Kitt Peak || Spacewatch || WIT || align=right | 1.1 km || 
|-id=662 bgcolor=#E9E9E9
| 298662 ||  || — || February 10, 2004 || Palomar || NEAT || — || align=right | 3.4 km || 
|-id=663 bgcolor=#E9E9E9
| 298663 ||  || — || February 11, 2004 || Kitt Peak || Spacewatch || MRX || align=right | 1.4 km || 
|-id=664 bgcolor=#E9E9E9
| 298664 ||  || — || February 14, 2004 || Haleakala || NEAT || AGN || align=right | 1.6 km || 
|-id=665 bgcolor=#E9E9E9
| 298665 ||  || — || February 14, 2004 || Socorro || LINEAR || — || align=right | 3.1 km || 
|-id=666 bgcolor=#E9E9E9
| 298666 ||  || — || February 10, 2004 || Palomar || NEAT || DOR || align=right | 3.5 km || 
|-id=667 bgcolor=#E9E9E9
| 298667 ||  || — || February 11, 2004 || Kitt Peak || Spacewatch || — || align=right | 3.7 km || 
|-id=668 bgcolor=#E9E9E9
| 298668 ||  || — || February 15, 2004 || Socorro || LINEAR || — || align=right | 2.6 km || 
|-id=669 bgcolor=#E9E9E9
| 298669 ||  || — || February 11, 2004 || Catalina || CSS || — || align=right | 3.5 km || 
|-id=670 bgcolor=#E9E9E9
| 298670 ||  || — || February 12, 2004 || Kitt Peak || Spacewatch || — || align=right | 2.6 km || 
|-id=671 bgcolor=#E9E9E9
| 298671 ||  || — || February 12, 2004 || Kitt Peak || Spacewatch || HOF || align=right | 3.1 km || 
|-id=672 bgcolor=#d6d6d6
| 298672 ||  || — || February 15, 2004 || Catalina || CSS || — || align=right | 4.2 km || 
|-id=673 bgcolor=#E9E9E9
| 298673 ||  || — || February 12, 2004 || Palomar || NEAT || — || align=right | 2.4 km || 
|-id=674 bgcolor=#E9E9E9
| 298674 ||  || — || February 14, 2004 || Kitt Peak || Spacewatch || — || align=right | 2.9 km || 
|-id=675 bgcolor=#E9E9E9
| 298675 ||  || — || February 13, 2004 || Kitt Peak || Spacewatch || — || align=right | 1.6 km || 
|-id=676 bgcolor=#E9E9E9
| 298676 ||  || — || February 11, 2004 || Catalina || CSS || — || align=right | 3.1 km || 
|-id=677 bgcolor=#E9E9E9
| 298677 ||  || — || February 12, 2004 || Kitt Peak || Spacewatch || — || align=right | 2.6 km || 
|-id=678 bgcolor=#d6d6d6
| 298678 ||  || — || February 12, 2004 || Kitt Peak || Spacewatch || KAR || align=right | 1.4 km || 
|-id=679 bgcolor=#E9E9E9
| 298679 ||  || — || February 17, 2004 || Socorro || LINEAR || GEF || align=right | 1.2 km || 
|-id=680 bgcolor=#FA8072
| 298680 ||  || — || February 19, 2004 || Socorro || LINEAR || — || align=right data-sort-value="0.70" | 700 m || 
|-id=681 bgcolor=#E9E9E9
| 298681 ||  || — || February 16, 2004 || Kitt Peak || Spacewatch || — || align=right | 2.7 km || 
|-id=682 bgcolor=#E9E9E9
| 298682 ||  || — || February 17, 2004 || Socorro || LINEAR || — || align=right | 2.9 km || 
|-id=683 bgcolor=#E9E9E9
| 298683 ||  || — || February 18, 2004 || Socorro || LINEAR || — || align=right | 2.2 km || 
|-id=684 bgcolor=#E9E9E9
| 298684 ||  || — || February 19, 2004 || Socorro || LINEAR || NEM || align=right | 3.3 km || 
|-id=685 bgcolor=#E9E9E9
| 298685 ||  || — || February 22, 2004 || Kitt Peak || Spacewatch || AGN || align=right | 1.6 km || 
|-id=686 bgcolor=#E9E9E9
| 298686 ||  || — || February 19, 2004 || Socorro || LINEAR || — || align=right | 2.8 km || 
|-id=687 bgcolor=#E9E9E9
| 298687 ||  || — || February 17, 2004 || Haleakala || NEAT || INO || align=right | 1.6 km || 
|-id=688 bgcolor=#d6d6d6
| 298688 ||  || — || February 19, 2004 || Socorro || LINEAR || — || align=right | 3.9 km || 
|-id=689 bgcolor=#E9E9E9
| 298689 ||  || — || February 26, 2004 || Socorro || LINEAR || — || align=right | 2.4 km || 
|-id=690 bgcolor=#E9E9E9
| 298690 ||  || — || February 17, 2004 || Kitt Peak || Spacewatch || — || align=right | 2.8 km || 
|-id=691 bgcolor=#E9E9E9
| 298691 ||  || — || February 26, 2004 || Kitt Peak || M. W. Buie || — || align=right | 2.8 km || 
|-id=692 bgcolor=#E9E9E9
| 298692 ||  || — || February 26, 2004 || Socorro || LINEAR || MRX || align=right | 1.4 km || 
|-id=693 bgcolor=#d6d6d6
| 298693 ||  || — || March 11, 2004 || Palomar || NEAT || — || align=right | 4.9 km || 
|-id=694 bgcolor=#E9E9E9
| 298694 ||  || — || March 11, 2004 || Palomar || NEAT || AGN || align=right | 1.7 km || 
|-id=695 bgcolor=#d6d6d6
| 298695 ||  || — || March 11, 2004 || Palomar || NEAT || — || align=right | 3.6 km || 
|-id=696 bgcolor=#d6d6d6
| 298696 ||  || — || March 11, 2004 || Palomar || NEAT || — || align=right | 3.5 km || 
|-id=697 bgcolor=#d6d6d6
| 298697 ||  || — || March 12, 2004 || Palomar || NEAT || — || align=right | 4.7 km || 
|-id=698 bgcolor=#E9E9E9
| 298698 ||  || — || March 15, 2004 || Kitt Peak || Spacewatch || — || align=right | 3.2 km || 
|-id=699 bgcolor=#E9E9E9
| 298699 ||  || — || March 15, 2004 || Socorro || LINEAR || — || align=right | 2.9 km || 
|-id=700 bgcolor=#d6d6d6
| 298700 ||  || — || March 14, 2004 || Kitt Peak || Spacewatch || — || align=right | 3.3 km || 
|}

298701–298800 

|-bgcolor=#E9E9E9
| 298701 ||  || — || March 14, 2004 || Palomar || NEAT || — || align=right | 3.8 km || 
|-id=702 bgcolor=#d6d6d6
| 298702 ||  || — || March 14, 2004 || Palomar || NEAT || — || align=right | 4.6 km || 
|-id=703 bgcolor=#E9E9E9
| 298703 ||  || — || March 14, 2004 || Palomar || NEAT || — || align=right | 3.1 km || 
|-id=704 bgcolor=#E9E9E9
| 298704 ||  || — || March 14, 2004 || Palomar || NEAT || — || align=right | 2.7 km || 
|-id=705 bgcolor=#d6d6d6
| 298705 ||  || — || March 14, 2004 || Palomar || NEAT || EUP || align=right | 4.4 km || 
|-id=706 bgcolor=#d6d6d6
| 298706 ||  || — || March 14, 2004 || Kitt Peak || Spacewatch || — || align=right | 4.4 km || 
|-id=707 bgcolor=#d6d6d6
| 298707 ||  || — || March 14, 2004 || Kitt Peak || Spacewatch || EOS || align=right | 2.1 km || 
|-id=708 bgcolor=#E9E9E9
| 298708 ||  || — || March 15, 2004 || Kitt Peak || Spacewatch || — || align=right | 2.3 km || 
|-id=709 bgcolor=#E9E9E9
| 298709 ||  || — || March 15, 2004 || Kitt Peak || Spacewatch || — || align=right | 2.5 km || 
|-id=710 bgcolor=#E9E9E9
| 298710 ||  || — || March 16, 2004 || Catalina || CSS || — || align=right | 3.2 km || 
|-id=711 bgcolor=#d6d6d6
| 298711 ||  || — || March 16, 2004 || Socorro || LINEAR || EOS || align=right | 2.6 km || 
|-id=712 bgcolor=#d6d6d6
| 298712 ||  || — || March 16, 2004 || Catalina || CSS || EUP || align=right | 6.2 km || 
|-id=713 bgcolor=#d6d6d6
| 298713 ||  || — || March 17, 2004 || Kitt Peak || Spacewatch || — || align=right | 2.7 km || 
|-id=714 bgcolor=#d6d6d6
| 298714 ||  || — || March 17, 2004 || Socorro || LINEAR || MEL || align=right | 3.9 km || 
|-id=715 bgcolor=#E9E9E9
| 298715 ||  || — || March 16, 2004 || Socorro || LINEAR || — || align=right | 2.8 km || 
|-id=716 bgcolor=#d6d6d6
| 298716 ||  || — || March 18, 2004 || Socorro || LINEAR || — || align=right | 3.3 km || 
|-id=717 bgcolor=#d6d6d6
| 298717 ||  || — || March 17, 2004 || Kitt Peak || Spacewatch || KOR || align=right | 1.3 km || 
|-id=718 bgcolor=#d6d6d6
| 298718 ||  || — || March 17, 2004 || Kitt Peak || Spacewatch || — || align=right | 2.4 km || 
|-id=719 bgcolor=#d6d6d6
| 298719 ||  || — || March 19, 2004 || Socorro || LINEAR || BRA || align=right | 2.5 km || 
|-id=720 bgcolor=#d6d6d6
| 298720 ||  || — || March 16, 2004 || Kitt Peak || Spacewatch || — || align=right | 4.3 km || 
|-id=721 bgcolor=#d6d6d6
| 298721 ||  || — || March 17, 2004 || Kitt Peak || Spacewatch || — || align=right | 2.8 km || 
|-id=722 bgcolor=#fefefe
| 298722 ||  || — || March 17, 2004 || Kitt Peak || Spacewatch || — || align=right data-sort-value="0.61" | 610 m || 
|-id=723 bgcolor=#d6d6d6
| 298723 ||  || — || March 22, 2004 || Socorro || LINEAR || — || align=right | 3.1 km || 
|-id=724 bgcolor=#d6d6d6
| 298724 ||  || — || March 21, 2004 || Kitt Peak || Spacewatch || — || align=right | 2.7 km || 
|-id=725 bgcolor=#d6d6d6
| 298725 ||  || — || March 19, 2004 || Socorro || LINEAR || EUP || align=right | 4.4 km || 
|-id=726 bgcolor=#d6d6d6
| 298726 ||  || — || March 20, 2004 || Socorro || LINEAR || — || align=right | 3.1 km || 
|-id=727 bgcolor=#E9E9E9
| 298727 ||  || — || March 23, 2004 || Socorro || LINEAR || DOR || align=right | 3.0 km || 
|-id=728 bgcolor=#d6d6d6
| 298728 ||  || — || March 26, 2004 || Kitt Peak || Spacewatch || — || align=right | 3.3 km || 
|-id=729 bgcolor=#d6d6d6
| 298729 ||  || — || March 26, 2004 || Socorro || LINEAR || — || align=right | 3.9 km || 
|-id=730 bgcolor=#d6d6d6
| 298730 ||  || — || March 26, 2004 || Socorro || LINEAR || Tj (2.97) || align=right | 7.5 km || 
|-id=731 bgcolor=#d6d6d6
| 298731 ||  || — || March 30, 2004 || Kitt Peak || Spacewatch || KOR || align=right | 1.9 km || 
|-id=732 bgcolor=#d6d6d6
| 298732 ||  || — || March 17, 2004 || Socorro || LINEAR || TIR || align=right | 2.9 km || 
|-id=733 bgcolor=#d6d6d6
| 298733 ||  || — || March 17, 2004 || Kitt Peak || Spacewatch || — || align=right | 2.7 km || 
|-id=734 bgcolor=#d6d6d6
| 298734 ||  || — || April 11, 2004 || Palomar || NEAT || — || align=right | 3.4 km || 
|-id=735 bgcolor=#d6d6d6
| 298735 ||  || — || April 12, 2004 || Kitt Peak || Spacewatch || EOS || align=right | 2.2 km || 
|-id=736 bgcolor=#d6d6d6
| 298736 ||  || — || April 13, 2004 || Palomar || NEAT || — || align=right | 5.9 km || 
|-id=737 bgcolor=#FA8072
| 298737 ||  || — || April 13, 2004 || Palomar || NEAT || — || align=right data-sort-value="0.97" | 970 m || 
|-id=738 bgcolor=#d6d6d6
| 298738 ||  || — || April 13, 2004 || Palomar || NEAT || — || align=right | 3.9 km || 
|-id=739 bgcolor=#d6d6d6
| 298739 ||  || — || April 12, 2004 || Siding Spring || SSS || — || align=right | 5.4 km || 
|-id=740 bgcolor=#d6d6d6
| 298740 ||  || — || April 15, 2004 || Anderson Mesa || LONEOS || — || align=right | 3.2 km || 
|-id=741 bgcolor=#d6d6d6
| 298741 ||  || — || April 12, 2004 || Kitt Peak || Spacewatch || — || align=right | 2.7 km || 
|-id=742 bgcolor=#d6d6d6
| 298742 ||  || — || April 13, 2004 || Kitt Peak || Spacewatch || — || align=right | 2.3 km || 
|-id=743 bgcolor=#d6d6d6
| 298743 ||  || — || April 13, 2004 || Kitt Peak || Spacewatch || — || align=right | 3.3 km || 
|-id=744 bgcolor=#d6d6d6
| 298744 ||  || — || April 13, 2004 || Kitt Peak || Spacewatch || KOR || align=right | 1.8 km || 
|-id=745 bgcolor=#d6d6d6
| 298745 ||  || — || April 13, 2004 || Kitt Peak || Spacewatch || — || align=right | 3.6 km || 
|-id=746 bgcolor=#d6d6d6
| 298746 ||  || — || April 13, 2004 || Kitt Peak || Spacewatch || — || align=right | 2.6 km || 
|-id=747 bgcolor=#FA8072
| 298747 ||  || — || April 15, 2004 || Socorro || LINEAR || — || align=right | 2.2 km || 
|-id=748 bgcolor=#d6d6d6
| 298748 ||  || — || April 11, 2004 || Palomar || NEAT || — || align=right | 4.1 km || 
|-id=749 bgcolor=#d6d6d6
| 298749 ||  || — || April 11, 2004 || Palomar || NEAT || — || align=right | 3.7 km || 
|-id=750 bgcolor=#d6d6d6
| 298750 ||  || — || April 14, 2004 || Kitt Peak || Spacewatch || — || align=right | 3.0 km || 
|-id=751 bgcolor=#fefefe
| 298751 ||  || — || April 16, 2004 || Palomar || NEAT || — || align=right data-sort-value="0.80" | 800 m || 
|-id=752 bgcolor=#d6d6d6
| 298752 ||  || — || April 16, 2004 || Kitt Peak || Spacewatch || BRA || align=right | 2.3 km || 
|-id=753 bgcolor=#d6d6d6
| 298753 ||  || — || April 20, 2004 || Socorro || LINEAR || — || align=right | 3.1 km || 
|-id=754 bgcolor=#d6d6d6
| 298754 ||  || — || April 20, 2004 || Kitt Peak || Spacewatch || — || align=right | 3.1 km || 
|-id=755 bgcolor=#d6d6d6
| 298755 ||  || — || April 20, 2004 || Kitt Peak || Spacewatch || — || align=right | 3.4 km || 
|-id=756 bgcolor=#d6d6d6
| 298756 ||  || — || April 21, 2004 || Socorro || LINEAR || — || align=right | 3.6 km || 
|-id=757 bgcolor=#d6d6d6
| 298757 ||  || — || April 22, 2004 || Siding Spring || SSS || EOS || align=right | 2.9 km || 
|-id=758 bgcolor=#d6d6d6
| 298758 ||  || — || April 24, 2004 || Catalina || CSS || Tj (2.99) || align=right | 3.9 km || 
|-id=759 bgcolor=#d6d6d6
| 298759 ||  || — || April 21, 2004 || Kitt Peak || Spacewatch || THM || align=right | 2.3 km || 
|-id=760 bgcolor=#d6d6d6
| 298760 ||  || — || April 20, 2004 || Kitt Peak || Spacewatch || — || align=right | 2.9 km || 
|-id=761 bgcolor=#d6d6d6
| 298761 ||  || — || April 25, 2004 || Kitt Peak || Spacewatch || — || align=right | 2.5 km || 
|-id=762 bgcolor=#fefefe
| 298762 ||  || — || April 26, 2004 || Mauna Kea || P. A. Wiegert || — || align=right data-sort-value="0.57" | 570 m || 
|-id=763 bgcolor=#d6d6d6
| 298763 ||  || — || May 15, 2004 || Socorro || LINEAR || — || align=right | 4.5 km || 
|-id=764 bgcolor=#d6d6d6
| 298764 ||  || — || May 15, 2004 || Socorro || LINEAR || — || align=right | 4.5 km || 
|-id=765 bgcolor=#d6d6d6
| 298765 ||  || — || May 21, 2004 || Needville || Needville Obs. || EOS || align=right | 2.8 km || 
|-id=766 bgcolor=#fefefe
| 298766 ||  || — || June 14, 2004 || Socorro || LINEAR || — || align=right data-sort-value="0.79" | 790 m || 
|-id=767 bgcolor=#FA8072
| 298767 ||  || — || July 9, 2004 || Palomar || NEAT || — || align=right data-sort-value="0.97" | 970 m || 
|-id=768 bgcolor=#fefefe
| 298768 ||  || — || July 12, 2004 || Siding Spring || SSS || — || align=right | 1.6 km || 
|-id=769 bgcolor=#fefefe
| 298769 ||  || — || July 11, 2004 || Socorro || LINEAR || — || align=right data-sort-value="0.81" | 810 m || 
|-id=770 bgcolor=#fefefe
| 298770 ||  || — || July 9, 2004 || Socorro || LINEAR || — || align=right | 1.1 km || 
|-id=771 bgcolor=#fefefe
| 298771 ||  || — || July 14, 2004 || Socorro || LINEAR || — || align=right data-sort-value="0.82" | 820 m || 
|-id=772 bgcolor=#fefefe
| 298772 ||  || — || July 17, 2004 || Socorro || LINEAR || FLO || align=right data-sort-value="0.65" | 650 m || 
|-id=773 bgcolor=#fefefe
| 298773 ||  || — || July 16, 2004 || Socorro || LINEAR || FLO || align=right data-sort-value="0.80" | 800 m || 
|-id=774 bgcolor=#fefefe
| 298774 ||  || — || August 6, 2004 || Reedy Creek || J. Broughton || FLO || align=right data-sort-value="0.89" | 890 m || 
|-id=775 bgcolor=#fefefe
| 298775 ||  || — || August 6, 2004 || Palomar || NEAT || — || align=right data-sort-value="0.79" | 790 m || 
|-id=776 bgcolor=#fefefe
| 298776 ||  || — || August 6, 2004 || Palomar || NEAT || — || align=right data-sort-value="0.90" | 900 m || 
|-id=777 bgcolor=#fefefe
| 298777 ||  || — || August 8, 2004 || Socorro || LINEAR || — || align=right data-sort-value="0.88" | 880 m || 
|-id=778 bgcolor=#fefefe
| 298778 ||  || — || August 8, 2004 || Anderson Mesa || LONEOS || — || align=right data-sort-value="0.93" | 930 m || 
|-id=779 bgcolor=#fefefe
| 298779 ||  || — || January 7, 1999 || Kitt Peak || Spacewatch || V || align=right data-sort-value="0.67" | 670 m || 
|-id=780 bgcolor=#fefefe
| 298780 ||  || — || August 9, 2004 || Socorro || LINEAR || FLO || align=right data-sort-value="0.68" | 680 m || 
|-id=781 bgcolor=#fefefe
| 298781 ||  || — || August 6, 2004 || Palomar || NEAT || — || align=right data-sort-value="0.92" | 920 m || 
|-id=782 bgcolor=#fefefe
| 298782 ||  || — || August 7, 2004 || Palomar || NEAT || V || align=right data-sort-value="0.80" | 800 m || 
|-id=783 bgcolor=#fefefe
| 298783 ||  || — || August 7, 2004 || Palomar || NEAT || — || align=right data-sort-value="0.96" | 960 m || 
|-id=784 bgcolor=#fefefe
| 298784 ||  || — || August 8, 2004 || Campo Imperatore || CINEOS || — || align=right data-sort-value="0.82" | 820 m || 
|-id=785 bgcolor=#fefefe
| 298785 ||  || — || August 8, 2004 || Socorro || LINEAR || FLO || align=right data-sort-value="0.54" | 540 m || 
|-id=786 bgcolor=#fefefe
| 298786 ||  || — || August 8, 2004 || Socorro || LINEAR || — || align=right data-sort-value="0.71" | 710 m || 
|-id=787 bgcolor=#fefefe
| 298787 ||  || — || August 10, 2004 || Socorro || LINEAR || — || align=right data-sort-value="0.79" | 790 m || 
|-id=788 bgcolor=#fefefe
| 298788 ||  || — || August 11, 2004 || Socorro || LINEAR || — || align=right data-sort-value="0.94" | 940 m || 
|-id=789 bgcolor=#fefefe
| 298789 ||  || — || August 8, 2004 || Socorro || LINEAR || FLO || align=right data-sort-value="0.91" | 910 m || 
|-id=790 bgcolor=#fefefe
| 298790 ||  || — || August 8, 2004 || Palomar || NEAT || FLO || align=right data-sort-value="0.77" | 770 m || 
|-id=791 bgcolor=#FA8072
| 298791 ||  || — || August 11, 2004 || Socorro || LINEAR || — || align=right | 1.3 km || 
|-id=792 bgcolor=#fefefe
| 298792 ||  || — || August 14, 2004 || Campo Imperatore || CINEOS || V || align=right data-sort-value="0.95" | 950 m || 
|-id=793 bgcolor=#fefefe
| 298793 ||  || — || August 18, 2004 || Wrightwood || J. W. Young || — || align=right | 1.0 km || 
|-id=794 bgcolor=#fefefe
| 298794 ||  || — || August 20, 2004 || Reedy Creek || J. Broughton || — || align=right data-sort-value="0.96" | 960 m || 
|-id=795 bgcolor=#fefefe
| 298795 ||  || — || August 20, 2004 || Kitt Peak || Spacewatch || — || align=right data-sort-value="0.85" | 850 m || 
|-id=796 bgcolor=#fefefe
| 298796 ||  || — || August 19, 2004 || Siding Spring || SSS || — || align=right | 1.1 km || 
|-id=797 bgcolor=#fefefe
| 298797 ||  || — || August 21, 2004 || Siding Spring || SSS || — || align=right data-sort-value="0.97" | 970 m || 
|-id=798 bgcolor=#fefefe
| 298798 ||  || — || August 24, 2004 || Socorro || LINEAR || — || align=right | 1.4 km || 
|-id=799 bgcolor=#fefefe
| 298799 ||  || — || August 22, 2004 || Kvistaberg || UDAS || — || align=right | 1.0 km || 
|-id=800 bgcolor=#fefefe
| 298800 ||  || — || August 25, 2004 || Kitt Peak || Spacewatch || — || align=right data-sort-value="0.93" | 930 m || 
|}

298801–298900 

|-bgcolor=#fefefe
| 298801 ||  || — || August 25, 2004 || Socorro || LINEAR || PHO || align=right | 1.6 km || 
|-id=802 bgcolor=#fefefe
| 298802 ||  || — || August 23, 2004 || Anderson Mesa || LONEOS || — || align=right data-sort-value="0.90" | 900 m || 
|-id=803 bgcolor=#fefefe
| 298803 ||  || — || September 6, 2004 || Altschwendt || W. Ries || V || align=right data-sort-value="0.79" | 790 m || 
|-id=804 bgcolor=#fefefe
| 298804 ||  || — || September 6, 2004 || Siding Spring || SSS || — || align=right data-sort-value="0.83" | 830 m || 
|-id=805 bgcolor=#fefefe
| 298805 ||  || — || September 6, 2004 || Siding Spring || SSS || — || align=right data-sort-value="0.81" | 810 m || 
|-id=806 bgcolor=#fefefe
| 298806 ||  || — || September 9, 2004 || Socorro || LINEAR || V || align=right data-sort-value="0.83" | 830 m || 
|-id=807 bgcolor=#fefefe
| 298807 ||  || — || September 7, 2004 || Socorro || LINEAR || — || align=right | 1.1 km || 
|-id=808 bgcolor=#fefefe
| 298808 ||  || — || September 7, 2004 || Socorro || LINEAR || FLO || align=right data-sort-value="0.96" | 960 m || 
|-id=809 bgcolor=#fefefe
| 298809 ||  || — || September 7, 2004 || Socorro || LINEAR || NYS || align=right data-sort-value="0.85" | 850 m || 
|-id=810 bgcolor=#fefefe
| 298810 ||  || — || September 8, 2004 || Socorro || LINEAR || V || align=right data-sort-value="0.83" | 830 m || 
|-id=811 bgcolor=#fefefe
| 298811 ||  || — || September 8, 2004 || Socorro || LINEAR || V || align=right data-sort-value="0.85" | 850 m || 
|-id=812 bgcolor=#fefefe
| 298812 ||  || — || September 8, 2004 || Socorro || LINEAR || FLO || align=right data-sort-value="0.69" | 690 m || 
|-id=813 bgcolor=#fefefe
| 298813 ||  || — || September 8, 2004 || Socorro || LINEAR || NYS || align=right data-sort-value="0.88" | 880 m || 
|-id=814 bgcolor=#fefefe
| 298814 ||  || — || September 8, 2004 || Socorro || LINEAR || — || align=right | 1.5 km || 
|-id=815 bgcolor=#fefefe
| 298815 ||  || — || September 8, 2004 || Socorro || LINEAR || — || align=right data-sort-value="0.99" | 990 m || 
|-id=816 bgcolor=#fefefe
| 298816 ||  || — || September 8, 2004 || Socorro || LINEAR || NYS || align=right data-sort-value="0.71" | 710 m || 
|-id=817 bgcolor=#fefefe
| 298817 ||  || — || September 8, 2004 || Socorro || LINEAR || — || align=right data-sort-value="0.87" | 870 m || 
|-id=818 bgcolor=#fefefe
| 298818 ||  || — || September 8, 2004 || Socorro || LINEAR || — || align=right data-sort-value="0.76" | 760 m || 
|-id=819 bgcolor=#fefefe
| 298819 ||  || — || September 8, 2004 || Socorro || LINEAR || — || align=right | 1.0 km || 
|-id=820 bgcolor=#fefefe
| 298820 ||  || — || September 8, 2004 || Socorro || LINEAR || NYS || align=right data-sort-value="0.86" | 860 m || 
|-id=821 bgcolor=#fefefe
| 298821 ||  || — || September 8, 2004 || Socorro || LINEAR || — || align=right | 1.0 km || 
|-id=822 bgcolor=#fefefe
| 298822 ||  || — || September 8, 2004 || Socorro || LINEAR || — || align=right | 1.1 km || 
|-id=823 bgcolor=#fefefe
| 298823 ||  || — || September 8, 2004 || Palomar || NEAT || — || align=right | 1.0 km || 
|-id=824 bgcolor=#FA8072
| 298824 ||  || — || September 9, 2004 || Socorro || LINEAR || — || align=right data-sort-value="0.90" | 900 m || 
|-id=825 bgcolor=#fefefe
| 298825 ||  || — || September 8, 2004 || Socorro || LINEAR || FLO || align=right data-sort-value="0.76" | 760 m || 
|-id=826 bgcolor=#fefefe
| 298826 ||  || — || September 8, 2004 || Socorro || LINEAR || — || align=right data-sort-value="0.85" | 850 m || 
|-id=827 bgcolor=#fefefe
| 298827 ||  || — || September 7, 2004 || Kitt Peak || Spacewatch || FLO || align=right data-sort-value="0.66" | 660 m || 
|-id=828 bgcolor=#fefefe
| 298828 ||  || — || September 8, 2004 || Socorro || LINEAR || — || align=right data-sort-value="0.98" | 980 m || 
|-id=829 bgcolor=#fefefe
| 298829 ||  || — || September 9, 2004 || Socorro || LINEAR || FLO || align=right data-sort-value="0.70" | 700 m || 
|-id=830 bgcolor=#fefefe
| 298830 ||  || — || September 10, 2004 || Socorro || LINEAR || — || align=right data-sort-value="0.87" | 870 m || 
|-id=831 bgcolor=#fefefe
| 298831 ||  || — || September 10, 2004 || Socorro || LINEAR || — || align=right data-sort-value="0.95" | 950 m || 
|-id=832 bgcolor=#fefefe
| 298832 ||  || — || September 10, 2004 || Kitt Peak || Spacewatch || — || align=right data-sort-value="0.98" | 980 m || 
|-id=833 bgcolor=#fefefe
| 298833 ||  || — || September 10, 2004 || Socorro || LINEAR || — || align=right data-sort-value="0.83" | 830 m || 
|-id=834 bgcolor=#fefefe
| 298834 ||  || — || September 13, 2004 || Eskridge || G. Hug || — || align=right | 1.1 km || 
|-id=835 bgcolor=#fefefe
| 298835 ||  || — || September 10, 2004 || Socorro || LINEAR || FLO || align=right data-sort-value="0.77" | 770 m || 
|-id=836 bgcolor=#fefefe
| 298836 ||  || — || September 10, 2004 || Socorro || LINEAR || V || align=right data-sort-value="0.85" | 850 m || 
|-id=837 bgcolor=#fefefe
| 298837 ||  || — || September 10, 2004 || Socorro || LINEAR || FLO || align=right data-sort-value="0.91" | 910 m || 
|-id=838 bgcolor=#fefefe
| 298838 ||  || — || September 10, 2004 || Socorro || LINEAR || V || align=right data-sort-value="0.82" | 820 m || 
|-id=839 bgcolor=#fefefe
| 298839 ||  || — || September 10, 2004 || Socorro || LINEAR || V || align=right data-sort-value="0.89" | 890 m || 
|-id=840 bgcolor=#fefefe
| 298840 ||  || — || September 10, 2004 || Socorro || LINEAR || V || align=right | 1.0 km || 
|-id=841 bgcolor=#fefefe
| 298841 ||  || — || September 10, 2004 || Socorro || LINEAR || V || align=right data-sort-value="0.92" | 920 m || 
|-id=842 bgcolor=#fefefe
| 298842 ||  || — || September 10, 2004 || Socorro || LINEAR || — || align=right | 1.6 km || 
|-id=843 bgcolor=#fefefe
| 298843 ||  || — || September 10, 2004 || Socorro || LINEAR || V || align=right data-sort-value="0.97" | 970 m || 
|-id=844 bgcolor=#fefefe
| 298844 ||  || — || September 10, 2004 || Socorro || LINEAR || PHO || align=right | 1.2 km || 
|-id=845 bgcolor=#fefefe
| 298845 ||  || — || September 10, 2004 || Socorro || LINEAR || FLO || align=right | 1.1 km || 
|-id=846 bgcolor=#fefefe
| 298846 ||  || — || September 10, 2004 || Socorro || LINEAR || V || align=right data-sort-value="0.97" | 970 m || 
|-id=847 bgcolor=#fefefe
| 298847 ||  || — || September 10, 2004 || Socorro || LINEAR || — || align=right | 1.0 km || 
|-id=848 bgcolor=#fefefe
| 298848 ||  || — || September 8, 2004 || Socorro || LINEAR || — || align=right data-sort-value="0.98" | 980 m || 
|-id=849 bgcolor=#fefefe
| 298849 ||  || — || September 11, 2004 || Socorro || LINEAR || — || align=right | 1.2 km || 
|-id=850 bgcolor=#fefefe
| 298850 ||  || — || September 9, 2004 || Kitt Peak || Spacewatch || — || align=right data-sort-value="0.73" | 730 m || 
|-id=851 bgcolor=#fefefe
| 298851 ||  || — || September 9, 2004 || Kitt Peak || Spacewatch || — || align=right data-sort-value="0.94" | 940 m || 
|-id=852 bgcolor=#fefefe
| 298852 ||  || — || September 10, 2004 || Socorro || LINEAR || NYS || align=right data-sort-value="0.79" | 790 m || 
|-id=853 bgcolor=#fefefe
| 298853 ||  || — || September 10, 2004 || Socorro || LINEAR || — || align=right | 1.2 km || 
|-id=854 bgcolor=#fefefe
| 298854 ||  || — || September 10, 2004 || Socorro || LINEAR || V || align=right data-sort-value="0.88" | 880 m || 
|-id=855 bgcolor=#fefefe
| 298855 ||  || — || September 10, 2004 || Kitt Peak || Spacewatch || FLO || align=right data-sort-value="0.88" | 880 m || 
|-id=856 bgcolor=#fefefe
| 298856 ||  || — || September 11, 2004 || Socorro || LINEAR || — || align=right | 1.2 km || 
|-id=857 bgcolor=#fefefe
| 298857 ||  || — || September 13, 2004 || Socorro || LINEAR || — || align=right data-sort-value="0.78" | 780 m || 
|-id=858 bgcolor=#fefefe
| 298858 ||  || — || September 13, 2004 || Socorro || LINEAR || ERI || align=right | 1.9 km || 
|-id=859 bgcolor=#fefefe
| 298859 ||  || — || September 13, 2004 || Palomar || NEAT || — || align=right | 1.0 km || 
|-id=860 bgcolor=#fefefe
| 298860 ||  || — || September 15, 2004 || 7300 Observatory || W. K. Y. Yeung || NYS || align=right data-sort-value="0.73" | 730 m || 
|-id=861 bgcolor=#fefefe
| 298861 ||  || — || September 10, 2004 || Socorro || LINEAR || V || align=right data-sort-value="0.87" | 870 m || 
|-id=862 bgcolor=#fefefe
| 298862 ||  || — || September 11, 2004 || Kitt Peak || Spacewatch || — || align=right data-sort-value="0.98" | 980 m || 
|-id=863 bgcolor=#fefefe
| 298863 ||  || — || September 12, 2004 || Socorro || LINEAR || — || align=right | 1.2 km || 
|-id=864 bgcolor=#fefefe
| 298864 ||  || — || September 15, 2004 || Kitt Peak || Spacewatch || — || align=right data-sort-value="0.87" | 870 m || 
|-id=865 bgcolor=#fefefe
| 298865 ||  || — || September 13, 2004 || Socorro || LINEAR || — || align=right data-sort-value="0.89" | 890 m || 
|-id=866 bgcolor=#fefefe
| 298866 ||  || — || September 13, 2004 || Socorro || LINEAR || — || align=right | 1.5 km || 
|-id=867 bgcolor=#d6d6d6
| 298867 ||  || — || September 15, 2004 || Anderson Mesa || LONEOS || HIL3:2 || align=right | 7.8 km || 
|-id=868 bgcolor=#fefefe
| 298868 ||  || — || September 15, 2004 || Anderson Mesa || LONEOS || — || align=right data-sort-value="0.95" | 950 m || 
|-id=869 bgcolor=#fefefe
| 298869 ||  || — || September 15, 2004 || Anderson Mesa || LONEOS || FLO || align=right data-sort-value="0.94" | 940 m || 
|-id=870 bgcolor=#fefefe
| 298870 ||  || — || September 15, 2004 || Anderson Mesa || LONEOS || — || align=right | 1.1 km || 
|-id=871 bgcolor=#fefefe
| 298871 ||  || — || September 15, 2004 || Anderson Mesa || LONEOS || FLO || align=right data-sort-value="0.65" | 650 m || 
|-id=872 bgcolor=#fefefe
| 298872 ||  || — || September 15, 2004 || Kitt Peak || Spacewatch || MAS || align=right data-sort-value="0.56" | 560 m || 
|-id=873 bgcolor=#fefefe
| 298873 ||  || — || September 16, 2004 || Siding Spring || SSS || FLO || align=right data-sort-value="0.84" | 840 m || 
|-id=874 bgcolor=#fefefe
| 298874 ||  || — || September 17, 2004 || Anderson Mesa || LONEOS || — || align=right | 1.1 km || 
|-id=875 bgcolor=#fefefe
| 298875 ||  || — || September 17, 2004 || Anderson Mesa || LONEOS || — || align=right | 1.2 km || 
|-id=876 bgcolor=#fefefe
| 298876 ||  || — || September 17, 2004 || Kitt Peak || Spacewatch || — || align=right | 1.7 km || 
|-id=877 bgcolor=#fefefe
| 298877 Michaelreynolds ||  ||  || September 23, 2004 || Jarnac || Jarnac Obs. || — || align=right data-sort-value="0.71" | 710 m || 
|-id=878 bgcolor=#fefefe
| 298878 ||  || — || September 17, 2004 || Socorro || LINEAR || — || align=right | 1.3 km || 
|-id=879 bgcolor=#fefefe
| 298879 ||  || — || September 17, 2004 || Socorro || LINEAR || — || align=right | 1.0 km || 
|-id=880 bgcolor=#fefefe
| 298880 ||  || — || September 17, 2004 || Socorro || LINEAR || — || align=right | 1.00 km || 
|-id=881 bgcolor=#fefefe
| 298881 ||  || — || September 17, 2004 || Kitt Peak || Spacewatch || — || align=right | 1.0 km || 
|-id=882 bgcolor=#fefefe
| 298882 ||  || — || September 17, 2004 || Socorro || LINEAR || — || align=right | 1.4 km || 
|-id=883 bgcolor=#fefefe
| 298883 ||  || — || September 17, 2004 || Socorro || LINEAR || V || align=right | 1.2 km || 
|-id=884 bgcolor=#fefefe
| 298884 ||  || — || September 18, 2004 || Socorro || LINEAR || — || align=right | 1.0 km || 
|-id=885 bgcolor=#fefefe
| 298885 ||  || — || September 18, 2004 || Socorro || LINEAR || — || align=right data-sort-value="0.92" | 920 m || 
|-id=886 bgcolor=#fefefe
| 298886 ||  || — || September 18, 2004 || Socorro || LINEAR || V || align=right data-sort-value="0.82" | 820 m || 
|-id=887 bgcolor=#fefefe
| 298887 ||  || — || September 18, 2004 || Socorro || LINEAR || — || align=right | 1.00 km || 
|-id=888 bgcolor=#fefefe
| 298888 ||  || — || September 23, 2004 || Goodricke-Pigott || R. A. Tucker || — || align=right data-sort-value="0.98" | 980 m || 
|-id=889 bgcolor=#d6d6d6
| 298889 ||  || — || October 5, 2004 || Goodricke-Pigott || R. A. Tucker || 3:2 || align=right | 8.3 km || 
|-id=890 bgcolor=#fefefe
| 298890 ||  || — || October 5, 2004 || Goodricke-Pigott || R. A. Tucker || V || align=right data-sort-value="0.78" | 780 m || 
|-id=891 bgcolor=#fefefe
| 298891 ||  || — || October 13, 2004 || Goodricke-Pigott || R. A. Tucker || NYS || align=right data-sort-value="0.65" | 650 m || 
|-id=892 bgcolor=#fefefe
| 298892 ||  || — || October 7, 2004 || Kitt Peak || Spacewatch || V || align=right data-sort-value="0.68" | 680 m || 
|-id=893 bgcolor=#fefefe
| 298893 ||  || — || October 4, 2004 || Kitt Peak || Spacewatch || — || align=right | 1.6 km || 
|-id=894 bgcolor=#fefefe
| 298894 ||  || — || October 4, 2004 || Anderson Mesa || LONEOS || FLO || align=right data-sort-value="0.80" | 800 m || 
|-id=895 bgcolor=#fefefe
| 298895 ||  || — || October 4, 2004 || Kitt Peak || Spacewatch || — || align=right | 2.2 km || 
|-id=896 bgcolor=#fefefe
| 298896 ||  || — || October 4, 2004 || Kitt Peak || Spacewatch || NYS || align=right | 1.1 km || 
|-id=897 bgcolor=#fefefe
| 298897 ||  || — || October 4, 2004 || Kitt Peak || Spacewatch || FLO || align=right data-sort-value="0.67" | 670 m || 
|-id=898 bgcolor=#fefefe
| 298898 ||  || — || October 4, 2004 || Kitt Peak || Spacewatch || — || align=right data-sort-value="0.79" | 790 m || 
|-id=899 bgcolor=#fefefe
| 298899 ||  || — || October 4, 2004 || Kitt Peak || Spacewatch || NYS || align=right data-sort-value="0.58" | 580 m || 
|-id=900 bgcolor=#fefefe
| 298900 ||  || — || October 5, 2004 || Kitt Peak || Spacewatch || FLO || align=right data-sort-value="0.93" | 930 m || 
|}

298901–299000 

|-bgcolor=#fefefe
| 298901 ||  || — || October 5, 2004 || Kitt Peak || Spacewatch || NYS || align=right data-sort-value="0.87" | 870 m || 
|-id=902 bgcolor=#fefefe
| 298902 ||  || — || October 5, 2004 || Kitt Peak || Spacewatch || V || align=right data-sort-value="0.87" | 870 m || 
|-id=903 bgcolor=#fefefe
| 298903 ||  || — || October 5, 2004 || Anderson Mesa || LONEOS || NYS || align=right data-sort-value="0.62" | 620 m || 
|-id=904 bgcolor=#fefefe
| 298904 ||  || — || October 5, 2004 || Anderson Mesa || LONEOS || — || align=right | 1.1 km || 
|-id=905 bgcolor=#fefefe
| 298905 ||  || — || October 6, 2004 || Kitt Peak || Spacewatch || NYS || align=right data-sort-value="0.63" | 630 m || 
|-id=906 bgcolor=#fefefe
| 298906 ||  || — || October 6, 2004 || Kitt Peak || Spacewatch || V || align=right data-sort-value="0.87" | 870 m || 
|-id=907 bgcolor=#fefefe
| 298907 ||  || — || October 6, 2004 || Palomar || NEAT || — || align=right | 1.3 km || 
|-id=908 bgcolor=#fefefe
| 298908 ||  || — || October 4, 2004 || Kitt Peak || Spacewatch || — || align=right | 1.1 km || 
|-id=909 bgcolor=#fefefe
| 298909 ||  || — || October 5, 2004 || Kitt Peak || Spacewatch || NYS || align=right data-sort-value="0.72" | 720 m || 
|-id=910 bgcolor=#fefefe
| 298910 ||  || — || April 4, 2003 || Kitt Peak || Spacewatch || V || align=right data-sort-value="0.70" | 700 m || 
|-id=911 bgcolor=#fefefe
| 298911 ||  || — || October 5, 2004 || Anderson Mesa || LONEOS || — || align=right data-sort-value="0.98" | 980 m || 
|-id=912 bgcolor=#fefefe
| 298912 ||  || — || October 5, 2004 || Kitt Peak || Spacewatch || NYS || align=right data-sort-value="0.59" | 590 m || 
|-id=913 bgcolor=#fefefe
| 298913 ||  || — || October 6, 2004 || Kitt Peak || Spacewatch || MAS || align=right data-sort-value="0.87" | 870 m || 
|-id=914 bgcolor=#fefefe
| 298914 ||  || — || October 6, 2004 || Palomar || NEAT || — || align=right | 1.3 km || 
|-id=915 bgcolor=#fefefe
| 298915 ||  || — || October 6, 2004 || Palomar || NEAT || NYS || align=right data-sort-value="0.85" | 850 m || 
|-id=916 bgcolor=#fefefe
| 298916 ||  || — || October 7, 2004 || Anderson Mesa || LONEOS || V || align=right data-sort-value="0.66" | 660 m || 
|-id=917 bgcolor=#fefefe
| 298917 ||  || — || October 7, 2004 || Kitt Peak || Spacewatch || V || align=right data-sort-value="0.72" | 720 m || 
|-id=918 bgcolor=#fefefe
| 298918 ||  || — || October 7, 2004 || Palomar || NEAT || NYS || align=right data-sort-value="0.88" | 880 m || 
|-id=919 bgcolor=#fefefe
| 298919 ||  || — || October 3, 2004 || Palomar || NEAT || V || align=right data-sort-value="0.89" | 890 m || 
|-id=920 bgcolor=#fefefe
| 298920 ||  || — || October 5, 2004 || Anderson Mesa || LONEOS || FLO || align=right data-sort-value="0.77" | 770 m || 
|-id=921 bgcolor=#fefefe
| 298921 ||  || — || October 7, 2004 || Socorro || LINEAR || V || align=right data-sort-value="0.82" | 820 m || 
|-id=922 bgcolor=#fefefe
| 298922 ||  || — || October 7, 2004 || Socorro || LINEAR || — || align=right data-sort-value="0.92" | 920 m || 
|-id=923 bgcolor=#fefefe
| 298923 ||  || — || October 8, 2004 || Anderson Mesa || LONEOS || V || align=right data-sort-value="0.75" | 750 m || 
|-id=924 bgcolor=#fefefe
| 298924 ||  || — || October 6, 2004 || Kitt Peak || Spacewatch || — || align=right data-sort-value="0.91" | 910 m || 
|-id=925 bgcolor=#fefefe
| 298925 ||  || — || October 6, 2004 || Kitt Peak || Spacewatch || PHO || align=right | 1.1 km || 
|-id=926 bgcolor=#fefefe
| 298926 ||  || — || October 6, 2004 || Kitt Peak || Spacewatch || — || align=right | 1.0 km || 
|-id=927 bgcolor=#fefefe
| 298927 ||  || — || October 6, 2004 || Kitt Peak || Spacewatch || NYS || align=right data-sort-value="0.81" | 810 m || 
|-id=928 bgcolor=#fefefe
| 298928 ||  || — || October 6, 2004 || Kitt Peak || Spacewatch || — || align=right data-sort-value="0.83" | 830 m || 
|-id=929 bgcolor=#fefefe
| 298929 ||  || — || October 6, 2004 || Kitt Peak || Spacewatch || — || align=right data-sort-value="0.95" | 950 m || 
|-id=930 bgcolor=#fefefe
| 298930 ||  || — || October 6, 2004 || Kitt Peak || Spacewatch || V || align=right data-sort-value="0.80" | 800 m || 
|-id=931 bgcolor=#fefefe
| 298931 ||  || — || October 7, 2004 || Socorro || LINEAR || FLO || align=right data-sort-value="0.77" | 770 m || 
|-id=932 bgcolor=#fefefe
| 298932 ||  || — || October 9, 2004 || Socorro || LINEAR || — || align=right | 1.3 km || 
|-id=933 bgcolor=#fefefe
| 298933 ||  || — || October 7, 2004 || Kitt Peak || Spacewatch || MAS || align=right data-sort-value="0.97" | 970 m || 
|-id=934 bgcolor=#fefefe
| 298934 ||  || — || October 7, 2004 || Kitt Peak || Spacewatch || FLO || align=right data-sort-value="0.77" | 770 m || 
|-id=935 bgcolor=#fefefe
| 298935 ||  || — || October 7, 2004 || Kitt Peak || Spacewatch || — || align=right | 3.0 km || 
|-id=936 bgcolor=#fefefe
| 298936 ||  || — || October 10, 2004 || Kitt Peak || Spacewatch || — || align=right data-sort-value="0.65" | 650 m || 
|-id=937 bgcolor=#fefefe
| 298937 ||  || — || October 8, 2004 || Kitt Peak || Spacewatch || FLO || align=right data-sort-value="0.84" | 840 m || 
|-id=938 bgcolor=#fefefe
| 298938 ||  || — || October 8, 2004 || Kitt Peak || Spacewatch || — || align=right data-sort-value="0.83" | 830 m || 
|-id=939 bgcolor=#fefefe
| 298939 ||  || — || October 8, 2004 || Kitt Peak || Spacewatch || — || align=right data-sort-value="0.90" | 900 m || 
|-id=940 bgcolor=#fefefe
| 298940 ||  || — || October 9, 2004 || Socorro || LINEAR || — || align=right | 1.2 km || 
|-id=941 bgcolor=#fefefe
| 298941 ||  || — || October 10, 2004 || Socorro || LINEAR || V || align=right data-sort-value="0.80" | 800 m || 
|-id=942 bgcolor=#fefefe
| 298942 ||  || — || October 9, 2004 || Kitt Peak || Spacewatch || NYS || align=right data-sort-value="0.88" | 880 m || 
|-id=943 bgcolor=#fefefe
| 298943 ||  || — || October 9, 2004 || Kitt Peak || Spacewatch || NYS || align=right data-sort-value="0.80" | 800 m || 
|-id=944 bgcolor=#fefefe
| 298944 ||  || — || October 9, 2004 || Kitt Peak || Spacewatch || NYS || align=right data-sort-value="0.81" | 810 m || 
|-id=945 bgcolor=#fefefe
| 298945 ||  || — || October 9, 2004 || Socorro || LINEAR || — || align=right data-sort-value="0.81" | 810 m || 
|-id=946 bgcolor=#fefefe
| 298946 ||  || — || October 10, 2004 || Kitt Peak || Spacewatch || — || align=right | 1.00 km || 
|-id=947 bgcolor=#fefefe
| 298947 ||  || — || October 10, 2004 || Kitt Peak || Spacewatch || NYS || align=right data-sort-value="0.90" | 900 m || 
|-id=948 bgcolor=#fefefe
| 298948 ||  || — || October 10, 2004 || Kitt Peak || Spacewatch || — || align=right | 1.00 km || 
|-id=949 bgcolor=#fefefe
| 298949 ||  || — || October 10, 2004 || Socorro || LINEAR || — || align=right | 1.2 km || 
|-id=950 bgcolor=#fefefe
| 298950 ||  || — || October 11, 2004 || Kitt Peak || Spacewatch || FLO || align=right data-sort-value="0.83" | 830 m || 
|-id=951 bgcolor=#fefefe
| 298951 ||  || — || October 11, 2004 || Kitt Peak || Spacewatch || NYS || align=right data-sort-value="0.79" | 790 m || 
|-id=952 bgcolor=#fefefe
| 298952 ||  || — || October 11, 2004 || Kitt Peak || Spacewatch || MAS || align=right data-sort-value="0.90" | 900 m || 
|-id=953 bgcolor=#fefefe
| 298953 ||  || — || October 4, 2004 || Palomar || NEAT || — || align=right | 1.4 km || 
|-id=954 bgcolor=#fefefe
| 298954 ||  || — || October 10, 2004 || Kitt Peak || Spacewatch || MAS || align=right data-sort-value="0.86" | 860 m || 
|-id=955 bgcolor=#fefefe
| 298955 ||  || — || October 8, 2004 || Kitt Peak || Spacewatch || — || align=right | 1.0 km || 
|-id=956 bgcolor=#fefefe
| 298956 ||  || — || October 11, 2004 || Kitt Peak || M. W. Buie || — || align=right data-sort-value="0.98" | 980 m || 
|-id=957 bgcolor=#fefefe
| 298957 ||  || — || October 7, 2004 || Socorro || LINEAR || — || align=right | 1.4 km || 
|-id=958 bgcolor=#fefefe
| 298958 ||  || — || October 13, 2004 || Kitt Peak || Spacewatch || — || align=right data-sort-value="0.98" | 980 m || 
|-id=959 bgcolor=#fefefe
| 298959 ||  || — || October 20, 2004 || Socorro || LINEAR || V || align=right data-sort-value="0.93" | 930 m || 
|-id=960 bgcolor=#fefefe
| 298960 ||  || — || November 3, 2004 || Kitt Peak || Spacewatch || NYS || align=right data-sort-value="0.91" | 910 m || 
|-id=961 bgcolor=#fefefe
| 298961 ||  || — || November 3, 2004 || Kitt Peak || Spacewatch || — || align=right | 1.1 km || 
|-id=962 bgcolor=#fefefe
| 298962 ||  || — || November 4, 2004 || Catalina || CSS || ERI || align=right | 2.2 km || 
|-id=963 bgcolor=#fefefe
| 298963 ||  || — || November 5, 2004 || Modra || A. Galád || — || align=right | 1.1 km || 
|-id=964 bgcolor=#fefefe
| 298964 ||  || — || November 4, 2004 || Catalina || CSS || NYS || align=right data-sort-value="0.76" | 760 m || 
|-id=965 bgcolor=#fefefe
| 298965 ||  || — || November 3, 2004 || Kitt Peak || Spacewatch || NYS || align=right data-sort-value="0.63" | 630 m || 
|-id=966 bgcolor=#fefefe
| 298966 ||  || — || November 3, 2004 || Kitt Peak || Spacewatch || NYS || align=right | 1.0 km || 
|-id=967 bgcolor=#fefefe
| 298967 ||  || — || November 4, 2004 || Kitt Peak || Spacewatch || — || align=right | 1.2 km || 
|-id=968 bgcolor=#fefefe
| 298968 ||  || — || November 5, 2004 || Palomar || NEAT || NYS || align=right data-sort-value="0.77" | 770 m || 
|-id=969 bgcolor=#fefefe
| 298969 ||  || — || November 7, 2004 || Socorro || LINEAR || NYS || align=right data-sort-value="0.70" | 700 m || 
|-id=970 bgcolor=#fefefe
| 298970 ||  || — || November 4, 2004 || Kitt Peak || Spacewatch || — || align=right data-sort-value="0.89" | 890 m || 
|-id=971 bgcolor=#fefefe
| 298971 ||  || — || November 4, 2004 || Kitt Peak || Spacewatch || NYS || align=right data-sort-value="0.82" | 820 m || 
|-id=972 bgcolor=#fefefe
| 298972 ||  || — || November 4, 2004 || Kitt Peak || Spacewatch || — || align=right | 1.1 km || 
|-id=973 bgcolor=#fefefe
| 298973 ||  || — || November 5, 2004 || Palomar || NEAT || MAS || align=right data-sort-value="0.90" | 900 m || 
|-id=974 bgcolor=#fefefe
| 298974 ||  || — || November 11, 2004 || Anderson Mesa || LONEOS || — || align=right | 1.1 km || 
|-id=975 bgcolor=#fefefe
| 298975 ||  || — || November 4, 2004 || Catalina || CSS || — || align=right data-sort-value="0.87" | 870 m || 
|-id=976 bgcolor=#fefefe
| 298976 ||  || — || November 11, 2004 || Kitt Peak || Spacewatch || NYS || align=right data-sort-value="0.61" | 610 m || 
|-id=977 bgcolor=#fefefe
| 298977 ||  || — || November 4, 2004 || Catalina || CSS || — || align=right data-sort-value="0.97" | 970 m || 
|-id=978 bgcolor=#fefefe
| 298978 ||  || — || November 17, 2004 || Siding Spring || SSS || FLO || align=right data-sort-value="0.92" | 920 m || 
|-id=979 bgcolor=#fefefe
| 298979 ||  || — || November 17, 2004 || Campo Imperatore || CINEOS || EUT || align=right data-sort-value="0.70" | 700 m || 
|-id=980 bgcolor=#fefefe
| 298980 ||  || — || November 18, 2004 || Socorro || LINEAR || NYS || align=right data-sort-value="0.92" | 920 m || 
|-id=981 bgcolor=#fefefe
| 298981 ||  || — || November 20, 2004 || Kitt Peak || Spacewatch || V || align=right data-sort-value="0.77" | 770 m || 
|-id=982 bgcolor=#fefefe
| 298982 ||  || — || November 20, 2004 || Kitt Peak || Spacewatch || MAS || align=right data-sort-value="0.90" | 900 m || 
|-id=983 bgcolor=#fefefe
| 298983 ||  || — || November 30, 2004 || Anderson Mesa || LONEOS || — || align=right | 1.1 km || 
|-id=984 bgcolor=#fefefe
| 298984 ||  || — || December 7, 2004 || Socorro || LINEAR || PHO || align=right | 1.7 km || 
|-id=985 bgcolor=#fefefe
| 298985 ||  || — || December 2, 2004 || Catalina || CSS || — || align=right | 1.1 km || 
|-id=986 bgcolor=#fefefe
| 298986 ||  || — || December 8, 2004 || Socorro || LINEAR || NYS || align=right | 1.1 km || 
|-id=987 bgcolor=#d6d6d6
| 298987 ||  || — || December 8, 2004 || Socorro || LINEAR || 3:2 || align=right | 4.9 km || 
|-id=988 bgcolor=#fefefe
| 298988 ||  || — || December 8, 2004 || Socorro || LINEAR || NYS || align=right data-sort-value="0.83" | 830 m || 
|-id=989 bgcolor=#fefefe
| 298989 ||  || — || December 8, 2004 || Socorro || LINEAR || NYS || align=right data-sort-value="0.88" | 880 m || 
|-id=990 bgcolor=#fefefe
| 298990 ||  || — || December 9, 2004 || Socorro || LINEAR || — || align=right data-sort-value="0.96" | 960 m || 
|-id=991 bgcolor=#fefefe
| 298991 ||  || — || December 9, 2004 || Catalina || CSS || NYS || align=right data-sort-value="0.91" | 910 m || 
|-id=992 bgcolor=#fefefe
| 298992 ||  || — || December 9, 2004 || Kitt Peak || Spacewatch || — || align=right data-sort-value="0.94" | 940 m || 
|-id=993 bgcolor=#fefefe
| 298993 ||  || — || December 10, 2004 || Socorro || LINEAR || V || align=right data-sort-value="0.91" | 910 m || 
|-id=994 bgcolor=#fefefe
| 298994 ||  || — || December 10, 2004 || Socorro || LINEAR || MAS || align=right | 1.00 km || 
|-id=995 bgcolor=#fefefe
| 298995 ||  || — || December 10, 2004 || Kitt Peak || Spacewatch || — || align=right data-sort-value="0.98" | 980 m || 
|-id=996 bgcolor=#fefefe
| 298996 ||  || — || December 10, 2004 || Kitt Peak || Spacewatch || — || align=right | 1.0 km || 
|-id=997 bgcolor=#fefefe
| 298997 ||  || — || December 10, 2004 || Socorro || LINEAR || MAS || align=right | 1.1 km || 
|-id=998 bgcolor=#fefefe
| 298998 ||  || — || December 10, 2004 || Kitt Peak || Spacewatch || MAS || align=right data-sort-value="0.78" | 780 m || 
|-id=999 bgcolor=#fefefe
| 298999 ||  || — || December 2, 2004 || Kitt Peak || Spacewatch || NYS || align=right data-sort-value="0.85" | 850 m || 
|-id=000 bgcolor=#fefefe
| 299000 ||  || — || December 10, 2004 || Socorro || LINEAR || — || align=right data-sort-value="0.97" | 970 m || 
|}

References

External links 
 Discovery Circumstances: Numbered Minor Planets (295001)–(300000) (IAU Minor Planet Center)

0298